This is an incomplete list of Acts of the Parliament of the United Kingdom for the years 1801–1819.  Note that the first parliament of the United Kingdom was held in 1801; parliaments between 1707 and 1800 were either parliaments of Great Britain or of Ireland).  For Acts passed up until 1707 see List of Acts of the Parliament of England and List of Acts of the Parliament of Scotland.  For Acts passed from 1707 to 1800 see List of Acts of the Parliament of Great Britain.  See also the List of Acts of the Parliament of Ireland.

For Acts of the devolved parliaments and assemblies in the United Kingdom, see the List of Acts of the Scottish Parliament, the List of Acts of the Northern Ireland Assembly, and the List of Acts and Measures of the National Assembly for Wales; see also the List of Acts of the Parliament of Northern Ireland.

The number shown after each Act's title is its chapter number. Acts passed before 1963 are cited using this number, preceded by the year(s) of the reign during which the relevant parliamentary session was held; thus the Union with Ireland Act 1800 is cited as "39 & 40 Geo. 3 c. 67", meaning the 67th Act passed during the session that started in the 39th year of the reign of George III and which finished in the 40th year of that reign.  Note that the modern convention is to use Arabic numerals in citations (thus "41 Geo. 3" rather than "41 Geo. III"). Acts of the last session of the Parliament of Great Britain and the first session of the Parliament of the United Kingdom are both cited as "41 Geo. 3".  Acts passed from 1963 onwards are simply cited by calendar year and chapter number.

All modern Acts have a short title, e.g. "the Local Government Act 2003".  Some earlier Acts also have a short title given to them by later Acts, such as by the Short Titles Act 1896.

1801 – 1809

1801

41 Geo. 3

| {{|Use of Fine Flour Act 1801|public|2|22-01-1801|note3=|repealed=y|archived=n|}}

| {{|National Debt Act 1801|public|3|22-01-1801|note3=|repealed=y|archived=n|}}

| {{|Unfunded Debt Act 1801|public|4|22-01-1801|note3=|repealed=y|archived=n|}}

| {{|Annuity to Sir Sidney Smith Act 1801|public|5|22-01-1801|note3=|repealed=y|archived=n|}}

| {{|Annuities to Lady Abercrombie, etc. Act 1801|public|59|22-01-1801|note3=|repealed=y|archived=n|}}

}}
 Apprenticeship Indentures Act 1801 c 22
 Appropriation, etc. Act 1801 c 84
 Bank Notes Forgery Act 1801 c 57
 Bounties Act 1801 c 13
 Bounties Act 1801 c 34
 Bounties Act 1801 c 92
 Certain Parliamentary Grants Act 1801 c 73
 Combinations of Workmen Act 1801 c 38
 Compensation for Injuries to Mills, etc. Act 1801 c 24
 Composition for a Crown Debt Act 1801 c 60
 Constables Expenses Act 1801 c 78
 Continuance of Acts Act 1801 c 45
 Controverted Elections Act 1801 c 101
 Copyright Act 1801 c 107
 Crown Debts Act 1801 c 90
 Crown Lands : Taxation Act 1801 c 47
 Customs Act 1801 c 87
 Customs Act 1801 c 89
 Customs Act 1801 c 94
 Damaging of Hides Act 1801 c 53
 Debtors Relief Act 1801 c 64
 Duties Continuance Act 1801 c 17
 Duty on Horses Act 1801 c 9
 Excise Act 1801 c 91
 Exportation Act 1801 c 21
 Exportation, etc. Act 1801 c 36
 Fines by Justices Act 1801 c 85
 Fish Act 1801 c 99
 Fish, Newfoundland, etc. Act 1801 c 77
 Fisheries, Continuance of Laws Act 1801 c 97
 Forgery of Banknotes Act 1801 c 39
 Foundling Hospital, Dublin Act 1801 c 50
 Habeas Corpus Suspension (Ireland) Act 1801 c 15
 Habeas Corpus Suspension Act 1801 c 26
 House of Commons (Clergy Disqualification) Act 1801 c 63
 House of Commons (Disqualifications) Act 1801 c 52. Also called the House of Commons (Disqualification) Act 1801.
 Importation Act 1801 c 37
 Importation Act 1801 c 41
 Importation Act 1801 c 93
 Importation, etc. Act 1801 c 68
 Imprisonment for Debts Abroad Act 1801 c 106
 Improvement of Commons Act 1801 c 20
 Inclosure (Consolidation) Act 1801 c 109
 Indemnity Act 1801 c 66
 Indemnity for Certain Acts Act 1801 c 46
 Indemnity (Ireland) Act 1801 c 49
 Indemnity to Certain Printers Act 1801 c 80
 Insolvent Debtors Relief Act 1801 c 70
 Irish Charges Act 1801 c 32
 Isle of Man Trade Act 1801 c 54
 Judges' Lodgings (Ireland) Act 1801 c 88
 Land Tax Redemption Act 1801 c 72
 Letters of Marque Act 1801 c 76
 Loans or Exchequer Bills Act 1801 c 81
 Loans or Exchequer Bills Act 1801 c 82
 Loans or Exchequer Bills Act 1801 c 83
 Lottery Act 1801 c 27
 Malta Act 1801 c 103
 Malting, etc., from Grain Act 1801 c 16
 Marine Mutiny Act 1801 c 18
 Master of the Rolls (Ireland) Act 1801 c 25
 Merchant Shipping Act 1801 c 19
 Militia Allowances Act 1801 c 55
 Militia Allowances Act 1801 c 56
 Militia (Ireland) Act 1801 c 6
 Militia Pay (England) Act 1801 c 43
 Militia Pay (Ireland) Act 1801 c 98
 Militia (Scotland) Act 1801 c 67
 Mutiny Act 1801 c 11
 National Debt Act 1801 c 65
 New Forest Act 1801 c 108
 Pluralties of Livings Act 1801 c 102
 Poor Rate Act 1801 c 23
 Postage Act 1801 c 7
 Prize Act 1801 c 96
 Probate Duty Act 1801 c 86
 Public Notaries Act 1801 c 79
 Quartering of Soldiers Act 1801 c 35
 Repeal of a Certain Tax Act 1801 c 100
 Sale of Bread Act 1801 c 12
 Sale of Wine, etc. Act 1801 c 48
 Seditious Meetings Prevention Act 1801 c 30
 Stamps (Ireland) Act 1801 c 58
 Steeping of Barley Act 1801 c 31
 Suppression of Rebellion (Ireland) Act 1801 c 14
 Suppression of Rebellion (Ireland) Act 1801 c 61
 Suppression of Rebellion (Ireland) Act 1801 c 104
 Taxation Act 1801 c 8
 Taxation Act 1801 c 10
 Taxation Act 1801 c 28
 Taxation Act 1801 c 29
 Taxation Act 1801 c 33
 Taxation Act 1801 c 40
 Taxation Act 1801 c 42
 Taxation Act 1801 c 44
 Taxation Act 1801 c 51
 Taxation Act 1801 c 62
 Taxation Act 1801 c 69
 Taxation Act 1801 c 71
 Taxation Act 1801 c 74
 Taxation Act 1801 c 75
 Trade with America Act 1801 c 95
 Witnesses on Petitions Act 1801 c 105

42 Geo. 3

| {{|Duties on Pensions, etc. Act 1801|public|2|29-10-1801|note3=|repealed=y|archived=n|}}

| {{|Fish Act 1801|public|3|29-10-1801|note3=|repealed=y|archived=n|}}

| {{|Repeal of 41 Geo 3 (Great Britain) c 17, etc. Act 1801|public|4|29-10-1801|note3=|repealed=y|archived=n|(repealed Duties Continuance Act 1801)}}

| {{|Duty on Worts, etc. Act 1801|public|5|29-10-1801|note3=|repealed=y|archived=n|}}

| {{|Lottery Act 1801|public|6|29-10-1801|note3=|repealed=y|archived=n|}}

| {{|Importation Act 1801|public|7|29-10-1801|note3=|repealed=y|archived=n|}}

| {{|National Debt Act 1801|public|8|29-10-1801|note3=|repealed=y|archived=n|}}

| {{|Loans or Exchequer Bills Act 1801|public|9|29-10-1801|note3=|repealed=y|archived=n|}}

| {{|Prize Act 1801|public|10|29-10-1801|note3=|repealed=y|archived=n|}}

| {{|Correspondence with Foreign Parts Act 1801|public|11|29-10-1801|note3=|repealed=y|archived=n|}}

| {{|Militia Quotas Act 1801|public|12|29-10-1801|note3=|repealed=y|archived=n|}}

| {{|Corn, etc. Act 1801|public|13|29-10-1801|note3=|repealed=y|archived=n|}}

| {{|Manufacture of Starch Act 1801|public|14|29-10-1801|note3=|repealed=y|archived=n|}}

| {{|Distillation from Wheat (Ireland) Act 1801|public|15|29-10-1801|note3=|repealed=y|archived=n|}}

| {{|Importation Act 1801|public|16|29-10-1801|note3=|repealed=y|archived=n|}}

}}

1802

42 Geo. 3
 Aliens Act 1802 c 92
 Annuities to Duke of Sussex etc. Act 1802 c 48
 Annuity to Lord Hutchinson, etc. Act 1802 c 113
 Appropriation Act 1802 c 120
 Bounties Act 1802 c 59
 British Fisheries, etc. Act 1802 c 79
 Controverted Elections Act 1802 c 106
 Collection of Revenues (Ireland) Act 1802 c 36
 Controverted Elections Act 1802 c 84
 Countervailing Duties Act 1802 c 27
 Criminal Jurisdiction Act 1802 c 85
 Customs Act 1802 c 95
 Deer Stealing (England) Act 1802 c 107
 Drawbacks Act 1802 c 60
 Duties Continuance Act 1802 c 31
 Duties, etc., on Coffee, etc. Act 1802 c 83
 Duties of Customs and Tonnage Act 1802 c 43
 Duties on Beer, etc. Act 1802 c 38
 Duties on Cinnamon, etc. Act 1802 c 24
 Duties on Horses, etc. Act 1802 c 100
 Duties on Rum, etc. Act 1802 c 20
 Duties on Servants, etc. Act 1802 c 37
 Duties on Sugar, etc. Act 1802 c 47
 Duties on Windows, etc. Act 1802 c 34
 Exchequer Bills Act 1802 c 41
 Excise Act 1802 c 93
 Excise Act 1802 c 96
 Exercise of Trade by Soldiers, etc. Act 1802 c 69
 Factories Act 1802 c 73
 Fort Marlborough in India Act 1802 c 29
 Gaming Act 1802 c 119
 Goods in Neutral Ships Act 1802 c 80
 Greenland Whale Fisheries Act 1802 c 22
 Hackney Coaches, Metropolis Act 1802 c 78
 Import and Export Duties Act 1802 c 117
 Importation Act 1802 c 44
 Income Tax Repeal, etc. Act 1802 c 42
 Indemnity Act 1802 c 23
 Indemnity (Ireland) Act 1802 c 53
 Irish Mariners, etc. Act 1802 c 61
 Isle of Man Trade Act 1802 c 98
 Lairy Embankment (Plymouth) Act 1802 c 32
 Land Tax Redemption Act 1802 c 116
 Lands for Ordnance Services, Woolwich Act 1802 c 89
 Linen Manufacture (Ireland) Act 1802 c 75
 Loans for Erection of Workhouses Act 1802 c 74
 Loans or Exchequer Bills Act 1802 c 17
 Loans or Exchequer Bills Act 1802 c 21
 Loans or Exchequer Bills Act 1802 c 110
 Loans or Exchequer Bills Act 1802 c 111
 Lord Chancellor of Ireland Act 1802 c 105
 Lotteries Act 1802 c 54
 Lottery Regulations Act 1802 c 104
 Marine Mutiny Act 1802 c 26
 Marine Mutiny Act 1802 c 51
 Marine Mutiny Act 1802 c 115
 Medicines Stamp Act 1802 c 56
 Metropolitan Police Magistrates Act 1802 c 76
 Militia Act 1802 c 90
 Militia Allowances Act 1802 c 55
 Militia Allowances Act 1802 c 64
 Militia Allowances Act 1802 c 65
 Militia (Ireland) Act 1802 c 109
 Militia (Ireland) Act 1802 c 118
 Militia (Scotland) Act 1802 c 91
 Militia Pay (England) Act 1802 c 49
 Militia (Stannaries) Act 1802 c 72
 Mutiny Act 1802 c 25
 Mutiny Act 1802 c 50
 Mutiny Act 1802 c 88
 National Debt Act 1802 c 33
 National Debt Act 1802 c 58
 National Debt Act 1802 c 71
 National Debt Act 1802 c 112
 National Debt Commissioners Act 1802 c 57
 Oaths at Parliamentary Elections Act 1802 c 62
 Pacific Ocean Fisheries Act 1802 c 77
 Paper Duties Act 1802 c 94
 Parish Apprentices Act 1802 c 46
 Parliament House, Dublin Act 1802 c 87
 Pluralities of Living, etc. Act 1802 c 86
 Post Horse Duties Act 1802 c 52
 Postage Act 1802 c 63
 Postage Act 1802 c 101
 Post Office Act 1802 c 81
 Proceedings Against Spiritual Persons Act 1802 c 30
 Public Accounts Act 1802 c 70
 Quartering of Soldiers Act 1802 c 108
 Repayment of Certain Loans Act 1802 c 39
 Repeal, etc., of Certain Duties Act 1802 c 103
 Restriction on Cash Payments Act 1802 c 40
 Restriction on Cash Payments Act 1802 c 45
 Smuggling Act 1802 c 82
 Southern Whale Fishery Act 1802 c 18
 Southern Whale Fishery Act 1802 c 114
 Stamps Act 1802 c 99
 Tortola Trade Act 1802 c 102
 Theft of Turnips, etc. Act 1802 c 67
 Trade in Grain, etc. Act 1802 c 35
 Transportation Act 1802 c 28
 Use of Clarke's Hydrometer Act 1802 c 97
 Westminster Fish Market Act 1802 c 19
 Yeomanry and Volunteers Act 1802 c 66
 Yeomanry (Ireland) Act 1802 c 68

43 Geo. 3

| {{|Militia (Ireland) Act 1802|public|2|16-11-1802|note3=|repealed=y|archived=n|}}

| {{|Duties on Malt, etc. Act 1802|public|3|16-11-1802|note3=|repealed=y|archived=n|}}

| {{|Duties on Pensions, etc. Act 1802|public|4|16-11-1802|note3=|repealed=y|archived=n|}}

| {{|Loans or Exchequer Bills Act 1802|public|5|16-11-1802|note3=|repealed=y|archived=n|}}

| {{|Indemnity Act 1802|public|6|16-11-1802|note3=|repealed=y|archived=n|}}

| {{|Navy, Victualling and Transport Bills Act 1802|public|7|16-11-1802|note3=|repealed=y|archived=n|}}

| {{|Baking Trade, Dublin Act 1802|public|8|16-11-1802|note3=|repealed=y|archived=n|}}

| {{|Militia Pay (Ireland) Act 1802|public|9|16-11-1802|note3=|repealed=y|archived=n|}}

| {{|Militia (Exemption of Religious Teachers) Act 1802|note1=|public|10|16-11-1802|note3=|repealed=y|archived=n|}}

| {{|Drawbacks and Bounties Act 1802|public|11|16-11-1802|note3=|repealed=y|archived=n|}}

| {{|Exportations, etc. Act 1802|public|12|16-11-1802|note3=|repealed=y|archived=n|}}

| {{|Exportations, etc. Act 1802|public|13|16-11-1802|note3=|repealed=y|archived=n|}}

| {{|Trade Between Great Britain and Ireland Act 1802|public|14|16-11-1802|note3=|repealed=y|archived=n|}}

| {{|Transportation Act 1802|public|15|16-11-1802|note3=|repealed=y|archived=n|}}

| {{|Inquiry into Certain Frauds and Abuses Act 1802|public|16|16-11-1802|note3=|repealed=y|archived=n|}}

| {{|Drawbacks Act 1802|public|17|16-11-1802|note3=|repealed=y|archived=n|}}

}}

1803

43 Geo. 3
 Actions Against Certain Spiritual Persons Act 1803 c 34
 Aliens Act 1803 c 155
 American Treaty Commissioners Act 1803 c 135
 Annuity (Lord Amherst) Act 1803 c 159
 Annuity to Admiral Saumarez Act 1803 c 37
 Annuity to Prince of Wales, etc. Act 1803 c 26
 Appropriation Act 1803 c 162
 Benefices (England) Act 1803 c 84
 Benefices (England) Act 1803 c 109
 Bonding of Wine Act 1803 c 103
 Bridges Act 1803 c 59
 Caledonian Canal Act 1803 c 102
 Casting Away of Vessels, etc. Act 1803 c 113
 Collection of Revenue, etc. (Ireland) Act 1803 c 98
 Collection of Revenue (Ireland) Act 1803 c 43
 Collection of Revenue (Ireland) Act 1803 c 97
 Continuance of Laws Act 1803 c 29
 Costs Act 1803 c 46
 Cotton Manufacture (Scotland) Act 1803 c 151
 Countervailing Duty Act 1803 c 154
 Courts of Justice, Canada Act 1803 c 138
 Customs Act 1803 c 68
 Customs Act 1803 c 70
 Customs Act 1803 c 128
 Customs Act 1803 c 131
 Defence of the Realm Act 1803 c 55
 Defence of the Realm (England) Act 1803 c 82
 Defence of the Realm (England) Act 1803 c 123
 Defence of the Realm (Ireland) Act 1803 c 85
 Defence of the Realm, London Act 1803 c 101
 Defence of the Realm (Scotland) Act 1803 c 83
 Defence of the Realm (Scotland) Act 1803 c 124
 Discovery of Longitude at Sea, etc. Act 1803 c 118
 Distribution of Certain Monies Act 1803 c 39
 Duties Continuance Act 1803 c 24
 Duties, etc. (Ireland) Act 1803 c 92
 Duties, etc., on Sugar, etc. Act 1803 c 42
 Duties on Auctioneers, etc. Act 1803 c 130
 Duties on Game Certificates Act 1803 c 23
 East India Company Act 1803 c 48
 East India Company Act 1803 c 63
 East India Company Act 1803 c 137
 Encouragement of Seamen, etc. Act 1803 c 160
 Estates of Lunatics Act 1832 c 75
 Exchequer Bills Act 1803 c 60
 Exchequer Bills Act 1803 c 148
 Excisable Goods on the Thames Act 1803 c 115
 Excise Act 1803 c 69
 Excise Act 1803 c 81
 Excise Act 1803 c 129
 Exportation Act 1803 c 49
 Exportation Act 1803 c 105
 Exportation of Gunpowder Act 1803 c 52
 Forgery of Foreign Bills Act 1803 c 139
 Friendly Societies Act 1803 c 111
 Gifts for Churches Act 1803 c 108
 Glebe Houses (Ireland) Act 1803 c 158
 Grant to the House of Orange Act 1803 c 149
 Greenland Whale Fishery Act 1803 c 32
 Grenada and Saint Vincent Traders Act 1803 c 40
 Grenada and Saint Vincent Traders Act 1803 c 104
 Habeas Corpus Act 1803 c 140
 Habeas Corpus Suspension (Ireland) Act 1803 c 116
 Hat Duties Act 1803 c 22
 Highway (Scotland) Act 1803 c 80
 House Tax Act 1803 c 161
 Importation in Neutral Vessel, etc. Act 1803 c 153
 Income Tax Act 1803 c 122
 Indemnity (Ireland) Act 1803 c 77
 Justices of the Peace, Nottingham Act 1803 c 45
 Justices Protection Act 1803 c 141
 Land for Ordnance Services Act 1803 c 65
 Land Tax Redemption Act 1803 c 51
 Land for Ordnance Services Act 1803 c 66
 Lands for Ordnance Services, Woolwich Act 1803 c 35
 Levy en Masse Act 1803 c 96. Sometimes called the Defence of the Realm, etc. Act 1803.
 Levy en Masse Amendment Act 1803 c 120. Sometimes called the Defence of the Realm Act 1803.
 Levy en Masse (London) Act 1803 c 125. Sometimes called the Defence of the Realm Act 1803.
 Loans for Erection of Workhouses Act 1803 c 110
 Loans for Parsonages, etc. (Ireland) Act 1803 c 106
 Loans or Exchequer Bills Act 1803 c 36
 Loans or Exchequer Bills Act 1803 c 93
 Loans or Exchequer Bills Act 1803 c 146
 Loans or Exchequer Bills Act 1803 c 147
 Lotteries Act 1803 c 91
 Malicious Shooting or Stabbing Act 1803 c 58
 Malt Duties, etc. (Scotland) Act 1803 c 145
 Marine Mutiny Act 1803 c 27
 Medicines Stamp Act 1803 c 73
 Militia Act 1803 c 19
 Militia Act 1803 c 50
 Militia Allowances Act 1803 c 72
 Militia (Great Britain) Act 1803 c 38
 Militia (Great Britain) Act 1803 c 62
 Militia (Great Britain) Act 1803 c 71
 Militia (Ireland) Act 1803 c 33
 Militia (Ireland) Act 1803 c 76
 Militia (Ireland) Act 1803 c 142
 Militia (Scotland) Act 1803 c 89
 Militia (Scotland) (No. 2) Act 1803 c 100
 Militia Pay and Allowances Act 1803 c 94
 Militia Pay and Allowances Act 1803 c 95
 Militia Pay (Ireland) Act 1803 c 88
 Mutiny Act 1803 c 20
 National Debt Act 1803 c 67
 Negotiation of Notes and Bills (Ireland) Act 1803 c 87
 Parliamentary Elections Act 1803 c 74
 Parliamentary Elections (Ireland) Act 1803 c 25
 Parochial Schools (Scotland) Act 1803 c 54
 Passenger Vessels Act 1803 c 56
 Pilots of Dover, etc. Act 1803 c 152
 Poor Act 1803 c 144
 Postage Act 1803 c 28
 Preservation of Black Game Act 1803 c 112
 Prisage and Butlerage of Wines Act 1803 c 156
 Prize Goods Act 1803 c 134
 Process (Ireland) Act 1803 c 53
 Public Officers Protection (Ireland) Act 1803 c 143
 Quartering of Soldiers Act 1803 c 41
 Queen Anne's Bounty Act 1803 c 107
 Relief of Discharged Soldiers and Sailors Act 1803 c 61
 Relief of Families of Militiamen Act 1803 c 47
 Restrictions on Cash Payments Act 1803 c 18
 Restrictions on Cash Payments Act 1803 c 44
 Roman Catholic Relief Act 1803 c 30
 Smuggling Act 1803 c 157
 Southern Whale Fishery Act 1803 c 90
 Stamps Act 1803 c 21
 Stamps Act 1803 c 126
 Stamps Act 1803 c 127
 Supply of Seamen Act 1803 c 64
 Suppression of Rebellion, etc. (Ireland) Act 1803 c 117
 Taxes Act 1803 c 99
 Taxes (Scotland) Act 1803 c 150
 The Chest at Chatham Act 1803 c 119
 Tortola Trade, etc. Act 1803 c 133
 Trade Between Great Britain and Ireland Act 1803 c 78
 Trade During Hostilities Act 1803 c 57
 Treasury Bills (Ireland) Act 1803 c 114
 Unlawful Combinations (Ireland) Act 1803 c 86
 Warehousing of Goods Act 1803 c 132
 Woods and Forests Act 1803 c 31
 Woollen Manufacture Act 1803 c 136
 Wrecking (Ireland) Act 1803 c 79
 Yeomanry and Volunteer Cavalry Act 1803 c 121

44 Geo. 3

| {{|Relief of Certain Curates (England) Act 1803|public|2|22-11-1803|note3=|repealed=y|archived=n|}}

| {{|Bonds of East India Company Act 1803|public|3|22-11-1803|note3=|repealed=y|archived=n|}}

| {{|Continuance of Laws Act 1803|public|4|22-11-1803|note3=|repealed=y|archived=n|}}

| {{|Drawbacks Act 1803|public|5|22-11-1803|note3=|repealed=y|archived=n|}}

| {{|Negotiations of Notes and Bills (Ireland) Act 1803|public|6|22-11-1803|note3=|repealed=y|archived=n|}}

| {{|Indemnity Act 1803|public|7|22-11-1803|note3=|repealed=y|archived=n|}}

| {{|Habeas Corpus Suspension (Ireland) Act 1803|public|8|22-11-1803|note3=|repealed=y|archived=n|}}

| {{|Suppression of Rebellion, etc. (Ireland) Act 1803|public|9|22-11-1803|note3=|repealed=y|archived=n|}}

| {{|Drawbacks Act 1803|public|10|22-11-1803|note3=|repealed=y|archived=n|}}

| {{|Distillation of Spirits Act 1803|public|11|22-11-1803|note3=|repealed=y|archived=n|}}

| {{|Exportation and Importation Act 1803|public|12|22-11-1803|note3=|repealed=y|archived=n|}}

| {{|Navy Act 1803|public|13|22-11-1803|note3=|repealed=y|archived=n|}}

| {{|Bonding of Wines Act 1803|public|14|22-11-1803|note3=|repealed=y|archived=n|}}

| {{|Loans or Exchequer Bills Act 1803|public|15|22-11-1803|note3=|repealed=y|archived=n|}}

| {{|Duties on Malt Act 1803|public|16|22-11-1803|note3=|repealed=y|archived=n|}}

| {{|Duties on Pensions, etc. Act 1803|public|17|22-11-1803|note3=|repealed=y|archived=n|}}

| {{|Volunteers and Yeomanry (Great Britain) Act 1803|public|18|22-11-1803|note3=|repealed=y|archived=n|}}

}}

1804 (44 Geo. 3)
 Accountant General in Chancery Act 1804 c 82
 Annuity to Family of Lord Kilwarden Act 1804 c 76
 Apprehension of Offenders Act 1804 c 92
 Appropriation Act 1804 c 110
 Archbishop's Palace, Dublin Act 1804 c 63
 Bonding of Spirits (Ireland) Act 1804 c 104
 Bonding of Sugar Act 1804 c 36
 British Fisheries Act 1804 c 86
 Caledonian Canal Act 1804 c 62
 Certificates of Attorneys, etc. Act 1804 c 59
 Civil List Act 1804 c 80
 Clergy Ordination Act 1804 c 43
 Collection of Revenue (Ireland) Act 1804 c 105
 Counterfeit Dollars and Tokens Act 1804 c 71
 Countervailing Duties Act 1804 c 27
 Crown Lands at Byfleet, Weybridge, etc., Surrey Act 1804 c 25
 Customs Act 1804 c 53
 Customs and Excise Act 1804 c 67
 Customs and Excise (Ireland) Act 1804 c 103
 Customs, Excise and Taxes Act 1804 c 26
 Defence of the Realm Act 1804 c 95
 Defence of the Realm, etc. Act 1804 c 56
 Defence of the Realm, etc. Act 1804 c 66
 Defence of the Realm, etc. Act 1804 c 74
 Defence of the Realm, London Act 1804 c 96
 Docks and Ordnance Service Act 1804 c 79
 Duty on Malt (Ireland) Act 1804 c 28
 East India Prize Goods Act 1804 c 72
 Enlistment of Foreigners Act 1804 c 75
 Exchequer Bills Act 1804 c 73
 Excisable Liquors (Scotland) Act 1804 c 55
 Excise Act 1804 c 49
 Export Duty Act 1804 c 57
 Exportation Act 1804 c 22
 Exportation Act 1804 c 70
 Exportation Act 1804 c 101
 Exportation and Importation Act 1804 c 65
 Greenland Fishery Act 1804 c 23
 Habeas Corpus Act 1804 c 102
 Hackney Coaches Act 1804 c 88
 Import Duty Act 1804 c 85
 Importation Act 1804 c 29
 Importation Act 1804 c 30
 Importation and Exportation Act 1804 c 109
 Importation, etc. Act 1804 c 35
 Importation, etc. Act 1804 c 89
 Income Tax Act 1804 c 37
 Income Tax Act 1804 c 83
 Inquiry into Public Offices (Ireland) Act 1804 c 106
 Insolvent Debtors Relief Act 1804 c 108
 Linen Manufacture (Ireland) Act 1804 c 42
 Linen Manufacture (Ireland) Act 1804 c 69
 Loans or Exchequer Bills Act 1804 c 31
 Loans or Exchequer Bills Act 1804 c 45
 Loans or Exchequer Bills Act 1804 c 46
 Loans or Exchequer Bills Act 1804 c 81
 London Docks (Warehousing of Goods) Act 1804 c 100
 Lotteries Act 1804 c 93
 Marine Mutiny Act 1804 c 20
 Marriages Confirmation Act 1804 c 77
 Masters and Workmen Act 1804 c 87
 Militia Act 1804 c 50
 Militia Act 1804 c 51
 Militia Allowances Act 1804 c 40
 Militia (Ireland) Act 1804 c 32
 Militia (Ireland) Act 1804 c 33
 Militia (Ireland) Act 1804 c 34
 Militia Pay (Great Britain) Act 1804 c 39
 Militia Pay (Ireland) Act 1804 c 41
 Mutiny Act 1804 c 19
 National Debt Act 1804 c 47
 National Debt Act 1804 c 48
 National Debt Act 1804 c 99
 Newfoundland Trade Act 1804 c 44
 Parliamentary Elections, Aylesbury Act 1804 c 60
 Payment of Creditors (Scotland) Act 1804 c 24
 Peace Preservation (Ireland) Act 1804 c 90
 Postage Act 1804 c 84
 Promissory Notes (Ireland) Act 1804 c 91
 Public Accounts Act 1804 c 58
 Purchase for Ordnance Service Act 1804 c 107
 Quartering of Soldiers Act 1804 c 38
 Restriction on Cash Payments (Ireland) Act 1804 c 21
 Sessions Houses, Westminster, etc. Act 1804 c 61
 Stamp Act 1804 c 98
 Stamps (Ireland) Act 1804 c 68
 Statute Duty Act 1804 c 52
 Treasury Bills (Ireland) Act 1804 c 97
 Weedon Barracks Act 1804 c 78
 Woollen Manufacture Act 1804 c 64
 Yeomanry Act 1804 c 54
 Yeomanry (Accounts) Act 1804 c 94

1805 (45 Geo. 3)
 Advance to Boyd, Benfield and Company Act 1805 c 78
 Annuity to Duke of Atholl, etc. Act 1805 c 123
 Appropriation Act 1805 c 129
 Assessed Taxes Act 1805 c 13
 Assessed Taxes Act 1805 c 105
 Audit of Public Accounts Act 1805 c 55
 Auditing of Public Accounts Act 1805 c 91
 Bank Notes (Forgery) Act 1805 c 89
 Bonded Warehouses Act 1805 c 87
 Bounties and Drawbacks Act 1805 c 24
 Bringing of Coals, etc., to London, etc. Act 1805 c 128
 British Museum Act 1805 c 127
 Civil List (Ireland) Act 1805 c 76
 Coasting Trade Act 1805 c 81
 Collection of Malt Duties, etc. Act 1805 c 53
 Continuance of Laws Act 1805 c 80
 Counterfeiting Bank of Ireland Silver Tokens, etc. Act 1805 c 42
 County Infirmaries (Ireland) Act 1805 c 111
 Crinan Canal Act 1805 c 85
 Crown Lands at Shilston Bay, Devon Act 1805 c 116
 Customs Act 1805 c 18
 Customs Act 1805 c 29
 Customs Act 1805 c 44
 Customs Act 1805 c 45
 Customs Act 1805 c 88
 Customs Act 1805 c 103
 Customs and Excise (Ireland) Act 1805 c 108
 Dealers in Excisable Articles Act 1805 c 52
 Distillation of Spirits Act 1805 c 100
 Drawbacks and Bounties Act 1805 c 93
 Drawbacks, etc. (Ireland) Act 1805 c 23
 Drawback on Linens Act 1805 c 98
 Duties on Glass Act 1805 c 122
 Duties on Malt Act 1805 c 1
 Duties on Malt, etc. Act 1805 c 22
 Duties on Paper Act 1805 c 106
 Duties on Pensions, etc. Act 1805 c 2
 Duties on Spanish Red Wine Act 1805 c 67
 Duties on Spirituous Liquors (Ireland) Act 1805 c 104
 Duty on Hops Act 1805 c 94
 Duty on Spanish Red Wines Act 1805 c 107
 Duty on Woollen Goods Act 1805 c 82
 Estates Held for the Barrack Service Act 1805 c 69
 Exchequer Bills Act 1805 c 27
 Excise Act 1805 c 30
 Excise and Taxes (Ireland) Act 1805 c 19
 Exportation and Importation Act 1805 c 33
 Forces of East India Company Act 1805 c 36
 Foreign Ships, etc. Act 1805 c 32
 Greenland Whale Fishery Act 1805 c 9
 Habeas Corpus Suspension (Ireland) Act 1805 c 4
 Harbour of Howth Act 1805 c 113
 Harbour of Leith Act 1805 c 114
 Harbours (Ireland) Act 1805 c 64
 Highways (Ireland) Act 1805 c 43
 Importation Act 1805 c 34
 Importation and Exportation Act 1805 c 57
 Importation and Exportation Act 1805 c 86
 Importation, Exportation, etc. Act 1805 c 26
 Income Tax Act 1805 c 15
 Income Tax Act 1805 c 49
 Income Tax Act 1805 c 110
 Indemnity Act 1805 c 6
 Indemnity for Certain Orders of Council Act 1805 c 97
 Inquiry into Military Departments Act 1805 c 47
 Inquiry into Naval Departments Act 1805 c 46
 Inquiry into Public Expenditure Act 1805 c 70
 Inquiry into Public Offices (Ireland) Act 1805 c 65
 Insolvent Debtors Relief Act 1805 c 3
 Irish Militia Act 1805 c 38
 Land Tax Act 1805 c 48
 Land Tax Redemption Act 1805 c 77
 Legacy Duty Act 1805 c 28
 Loans or Exchequer Bills Act 1805 c 7
 Loans or Exchequer Bills, etc. Act 1805 c 118
 Loans or Exchequer Bills, etc. Act 1805 c 119
 Loans or Exchequer Bills, etc. Act 1805 c 120
 Losses During Rebellion in Ireland Act 1805 c 79
 Lotteries Act 1805 c 74
 Manning of the Navy Act 1805 c 72
 Marine Mutiny Act 1805 c 17
 Militia Act 1805 c 90
 Militia Allowances Act 1805 c 60
 Militia Allowances Act 1805 c 61
 Militia (Great Britain) Act 1805 c 31
 Militia Pay (Great Britain) Act 1805 c 62
 Militia Pay (Ireland) Act 1805 c 63
 Military Survey (Ireland) Act 1805 c 109
 Mutiny Act 1805 c 16
 National Debt Act 1805 c 8
 National Debt Act 1805 c 12
 National Debt Act 1805 c 40
 National Debt Act 1805 c 73
 Negotiations of Notes and Bills Act 1805 c 25
 Office of Paymaster General Act 1805 c 58
 Offices in the Court of Chancery Act 1805 c 75
 Parliamentary Elections (Ireland) Act 1805 c 59
 Paving of Streets, etc., Dublin Act 1805 c 112
 Pilchard Fishery Act 1805 c 102
 Poor Act 1805 c 54
 Postage Act 1805 c 11
 Postage Act 1805 c 21
 Post Horse Duties Act 1805 c 56
 Preservation of Timber Trees, etc. Act 1805 c 66
 Privilege of Parliament Act 1805 c 124
 Proceedings Against Luke Fox Act 1805 c 117
 Proceedings now depending in the House of Commons shall not be discontinued c 125
 Proceedings indemnify Persons who shall give Evidence against Henry Lord Viscount Melville c 126
 Promissory Notes, etc. (Ireland) Act 1805 c 41
 Public Buildings - Houses of Parliament Act 1805 c 115
 Purchase of Advowsons by Colleges Act 1805 c 101
 Quarantine Act 1805 c 10
 Quartering of Soldiers Act 1805 c 37
 Queen Anne's Bounty Act 1805 c 84
 Sailcloth Manufacture, etc. Act 1805 c 68
 Sale of Spirituous Liquors Act 1805 c 50
 Salt Duties Act 1805 c 14
 Smuggling Act 1805 c 121
 Smuggling, etc. Act 1805 c 99
 Southern Whale Fishery Act 1805 c 96
 Spirits Act 1805 c 39
 Stamps (Ireland) Act 1805 c 20
 Stamps (Ireland) Act 1805 c 51
 Taxation Act 1805 c 5
 Taxes Act 1805 c 71
 Taxes (Scotland) Act 1805 c 95
 Treaty of Commerce, etc., with America Act 1805 c 35
 Woollen Manufacture Act 1805 c 83
 Writ of Subpœna Act 1805 c 92

1806 (46 Geo. 3)
 Actions, etc., for Buying Oak Bark, etc. Act 1806 c 152
 Annuities to Royal Family Act 1806 c 145
 Annuity to Admiral Duckworth Act 1806 c 40
 Annuity to Lady Nelson Act 1806 c 4
 Annuity to Lord Collingwood, etc. Act 1806 c 13
 Annuity to Lord Rodney Act 1806 c 147
 Annuity to Lord Saint Vincent Act 1806 c 50
 Annuity to Sir Richard Strachan Act 1806 c 5
 Appraisers Licences Act 1806 c 43
 Appropriation Act 1806 c 149
 Assessed Taxes Act 1806 c 78
 Audit of Public Accounts Act 1806 c 141
 Auditor of the Exchequer Act 1806 c 1
 Bankrupts Act 1806 c 135
 Bonding of Spirits Act 1806 c 27
 Bonding Warehouses Act 1806 c 137
 Bounty on Exportation Act 1806 c 99
 Bounty on Silk Manufactures Act 1806 c 110
 Bounty on Sugar, etc. Act 1806 c 109
 Bringing Coals to London, etc. Act 1806 c 104
 British Fisheries Act 1806 c 34
 British Fisheries Act 1806 c 156
 Canals, etc. (Scotland) Act 1806 c 155
 Cape of Good Hope Trade Act 1806 c 30
 Cape Rock Lighthouse (Scotland) Act 1806 c 132
 Chest Of Greenwich Act 1806 c 101
 Consolidated Fund Act 1806 c 44
 Continuance of Laws Act 1806 c 29
 Court of Chancery Act 1806 c 129
 Court of Exchequer (Scotland) Act 1806 c 154
 Crown Lands Act 1806 c 151
 Customs Act 1806 c 150
 Customs and Excise Act 1806 c 38
 Customs and Excise (Ireland) Act 1806 c 58
 Customs (Ireland) Act 1806 c 87
 Defence of the Realm Act 1806 c 51
 Defence of the Realm Act 1806 c 90
 Defence of the Realm (Ireland) Act 1806 c 63
 Defence of the Realm, London Act 1806 c 144
 Discovery of Longitude at Sea, etc. Act 1806 c 77
 Docks, etc., at Chatham, etc. Act 1806 c 130
 Drawback Act 1806 c 114
 Drawbacks (Ireland) Act 1806 c 14
 Drawbacks upon Sugar Act 1806 c 10
 Dublin Paying, etc., Inquiry Act 1806 c 68
 Duke of Grafton's Annuity Act 1806 c 79
 Duties and Drawbacks (Ireland) Act 1806 c 12
 Duties and Drawbacks (Ireland) Act 1806 c 62
 Duties, Bounties, etc. (Ireland) Act 1806 c 120
 Duties of Prisage and Butlerage (Ireland) Act 1806 c 94
 Duties on Certain Goods Act 1806 c 42
 Duties on Malt Act 1806 c 2
 Duties on Pensions, etc. Act 1806 c 3
 Duties on Spirits (Ireland) Act 1806 c 56
 Duties on Spirits (Ireland) Act 1806 c 88
 Duties on Stills, etc. (Scotland) Act 1806 c 102
 Duty on Houses Act 1806 c 36
 East India Company Act 1806 c 85
 Education (Ireland) Act 1806 c 122
 Enlistment of Foreigners Act 1806 c 23
 Estates of Granada and Saint Vincent Traders Act 1806 c 157
 Estates of Granada and Saint Vincent Traders Act 1806 c 158
 Exchequer Bills Act 1806 c 93
 Excise Act 1806 c 39
 Excise Act 1806 c 75
 Excise Act 1806 c 112
 Excise Act 1806 c 138
 Excise Act 1806 c 139
 Exportation Act 1806 c 11
 Exportation Act 1806 c 17
 Exportation Act 1806 c 115
 Exportation Act 1806 c 116
 Fees, Port of London, etc. Act 1806 c 82
 Fortifications - Portsmouth and Dover Act 1806 c 105
 Grain Between Great Britain and Ireland Act 1806 c 97
 Greenland Whale Fishery Act 1806 c 9
 Greenwich Hospital Act 1806 c 100
 Highways (Ireland) Act 1806 c 96
 Highways (Ireland) Act 1806 c 134
 Hospitals and Infirmaries (Ireland) Act 1806 c 95
 Houses of Parliament Act 1806 c 89
 Importation Act 1806 c 74
 Importation Act 1806 c 103
 Importation Act 1806 c 113
 Importation Act 1806 c 117
 Importation Act 1806 c 121
 Importation, etc. Act 1806 c 53
 Income Tax Act 1806 c 65
 Indemnity Act 1806 c 7
 Insolvent Debtors Relief Act 1806 c 108
 Irish Militia Act 1806 c 124
 Land, Tax, etc. Act 1806 c 107
 Land Tax Redemption Act 1806 c 133
 Lewis (Estates and Crown Claims) Act 1806 c 131
 Loans or Exchequer Bills Act 1806 c 6
 Loans or Exchequer Bills Act 1806 c 25
 Loans or Exchequer Bills Act 1806 c 26
 Loans or Exchequer Bills Act 1806 c 41
 Lotteries Act 1806 c 148
 Malt and Spirit Duties (Ireland) Act 1806 c 67
 Malt Duties, etc. Act 1806 c 57
 Marine Mutiny Act 1806 c 8
 Masters in Chancery Act 1806 c 128
 Militia Act 1806 c 91
 Militia Act 1806 c 140
 Militia Allowances Act 1806 c 20
 Militia Allowances Act 1806 c 21
 Militia (Ireland) Act 1806 c 31
 Militia Pay (Great Britain) Act 1806 c 19
 Militia Pay (Ireland) Act 1806 c 22
 Mines (Ireland) Act 1806 c 71
 Mutiny Act 1806 c 15
 Mutiny Act 1806 c 48
 Mutiny Act 1806 c 66
 National Debt Act 1806 c 33
 National Debt Act 1806 c 47
 National Debt Act 1806 c 55
 Navy Act 1806 c 127
 Neutral Ships Act 1806 c 111
 Norwich Castle and Gaol Act 1806 c 86
 Offences at Sea Act 1806 c 54
 Packing of Butter (Ireland) Act 1806 c 59
 Payment of Creditors (Scotland) Act 1806 c 24
 Pensions, to Soldiers Act 1806 c 69
 Postage Act 1806 c 61
 Postage Act 1806 c 73
 Postage Act 1806 c 92
 Post Office Act 1806 c 83
 Private (Annuity-Lord Nelson) Act 1806 c 146
 Public Harbours Act 1806 c 153
 Purchase of Quays in Port of London Act 1806 c 118
 Quarantine (Great Britain) Act 1806 c 98
 Quartering of Soldiers Act 1806 c 126
 Receiver General of Stamps Act 1806 c 76
 Revenue (Ireland) Act 1806 c 106
 Salaries of Judges (Scotland) Act 1806 c 49
 Sale of Crown Rents (Ireland) Act 1806 c 123
 Slave Trade Act 1806 c 52
 Slave Trade Act 1806 c 119
 Small Livings (Ireland) Act 1806 c 60
 Spirit, etc., Licences (Ireland) Act 1806 c 70
 Stage Coaches, etc. Act 1806 c 136
 Stamps (Ireland) Act 1806 c 35
 Stamps (Ireland) Act 1806 c 64
 Taxation Act 1806 c 84
 Thread Lace Manufacture (England) Act 1806 c 81
 Tortola Trade Act 1806 c 72
 Transportation, etc. Act 1806 c 28
 Treasury Bills (Ireland) Act 1806 c 32
 Treasury Bills (Ireland) Act 1806 c 46
 Treasury of the Ordnance Act 1806 c 45
 Treaty of Commerce, etc., with America Act 1806 c 16
 West Indies Act 1806 c 80
 Windsor Forest Act 1806 c 143
 Witnesses Act 1806 c 37
 Woods and Forests Act 1806 c 142
 Woollen Manufacture Act 1806 c 18
 Yeomanry, etc. Act 1806 c 125

1807

47 Geo. 3 Sess. 1
 Abolition of Slave Trade Act 1807 c 36
 Accounts, etc., of Barrack Master General Act 1807 c 13
 Annuities to Branches of Royal Family Act 1807 c 39
 Arms and Gunpowder (Ireland) Act 1807 c 8
 Army and Navy Act 1807 c 15
 Assessed Taxes (Ireland) Act 1807 c 21
 Auction Duties (Ireland) Act 1807 c 17
 Bonding of Coffee, etc. Act 1807 c 48
 Bounties (Great Britain) Act 1807 c 29
 Bounties on Sugar Act 1807 c 22
 Bringing of Coals, etc., to London Act 1807 c 34
 Cape of Good Hope Trade Act 1807 c 11
 Charge of Loan Act 1807 c 55
 Collieries (Ireland) Act 1807 c 45
 Controverted Elections Act 1807 c 1
 Controverted Elections (Ireland) Act 1807 c 14
 Customs Act 1807 c 51
 Customs (Ireland) Act 1807 c 12
 Depredations on the Thames Act 1807 c 37
 Drawbacks Act 1807 c 20
 Drawbacks (Ireland) Act 1807 c 19
 Duties, etc., on Malt, etc. (Ireland) Act 1807 c 40
 Duties on Malt Act 1807 c 3
 Duties on Pensions, etc. Act 1807 c 4
 Excise Act 1807 c 27
 Excise Duties and Taxes (Ireland) Act 1807 c 18
 Excise (Ireland) Act 1807 c 35
 Exportation Act 1807 c 9
 Exportation Act 1807 c 30
 Exportation Act 1807 c 49
 Fees, etc., in Public Offices (Ireland) Act 1807 c 41
 Greenwich Hospital Act 1807 c 52
 Hospitals (Ireland) Act 1807 c 44
 Importation Act 1807 c 24
 Importation Act 1807 c 25
 Importation Act 1807 c 26
 Importation (Ireland) Act 1807 c 31
 Indemnity Act 1807 c 5
 Interchange of Grain Between Great Britain and Ireland Act 1807 c 7
 Irish Militia Act 1807 c 6
 Lighting, etc., of Cities (Ireland) Act 1807 c 42
 Loans or Exchequer Bills Act 1807 c 2
 Marine Mutiny Act 1807 c 33
 Mutiny Act 1807 c 32
 National Debt Act 1807 c 28
 National Debt Act 1807 c 46
 Paper Duties (Ireland) Act 1807 c 38
 Prize Act 1807 c 47
 Quartering of Soldiers Act 1807 c 54
 Regrating and Ingrossing of Oaken Bark Act 1807 c 53
 Sale of Crown Rents, etc. (Ireland) Act 1807 c 16
 Servants' Wages (Ireland) Act 1807 c 43
 South Sea Company Act 1807 c 23
 Stamps (Ireland) Act 1807 c 50
 Treasurer of the Navy Act 1807 c 56
 Treasury Bills (Ireland) Act 1807 c 10

47 Geo. 3 Sess. 2
 Annuities (Ireland) Act 1807 c 21
 Annuity to Major-General Sir John Stuart Act 1807 c 4
 Appropriation Act 1807 c 76
 Assessed Taxes, etc. (Ireland) Act 1807 c 11
 Auction Duty Act 1807 c 65
 Benefices Act 1807 c 75
 Bounty on British Calicoes Act 1807 c 64
 British Fisheries Act 1807 c 51
 British Museum Act 1807 c 36
 Commissioners of the Treasury Act 1807 c 20
 Countervailing Duties (Ireland) Act 1807 c 18
 County Infirmaries (Ireland) Act 1807 c 50
 Crown Lands at Egham, Exchange King and David Jebb Act 1807 c 77
 Crown Lands, Escheats Act 1807 c 24
 Customs Act 1807 c 61
 Customs and Excise (Ireland) Act 1807 c 48
 Debts of Traders Act 1807 c 74
 Drawback Act 1807 c 49
 Drawbacks Act 1807 c 62
 Duties on Calicoes, etc. Act 1807 c 47
 Duties on Spirits (Ireland) Act 1807 c 17
 Duty on Coffee, etc., Warehoused Act 1807 c 52
 East India Company Act 1807 c 41
 Exchequer Bills Act 1807 c 28
 Excise Act 1807 c 37
 Excise and Stamps (Ireland) Act 1807 c 14
 Excise Duties and Drawbacks Act 1807 c 63
 Excise, etc. (Great Britain) Act 1807 c 30
 Export of Salted Beef, etc. (Ireland) Act 1807 c 10
 Exportation (Ireland) Act 1807 c 58
 Fisheries (Ireland) Act 1807 c 22
 General de Lancey (Crown Claims) Act 1807 c 69
 Grant of Frogmore, etc. Act 1807 c 45
 Grants for Glebe Houses (Ireland) Act 1807 c 23
 Half-pay and Pensions Act 1807 c 25
 Importation Act 1807 c 27
 Importation Act 1807 c 67
 Importation and Exportation Act 1807 c 34
 Importation and Exportation (Ireland) Act 1807 c 1
 Importation and Exportation (Ireland) Act 1807 c 16
 Indemnity Act 1807 c 3
 Indemnity Act 1807 c 35
 India Government, etc. Act 1807 c 68
 Inquiry into Military Departments Act 1807 c 33
 Insurrection and Disturbances (Ireland) Act 1807 c 13
 Kilmainham Hospital Pensions Act 1807 c 5
 Loans or Exchequer Bills Act 1807 c 6
 Loans or Exchequer Bills Act 1807 c 7
 Loans on Exchequer Bills Act 1807 c 73
 Lord Powerscourt's Mansion Act 1807 c 78
 Lotteries Act 1807 c 9
 Militia Allowances Act 1807 c 31
 Militia Allowances Act 1807 c 32
 Militia (Great Britain) Act 1807 c 57
 Militia (Great Britain) Act 1807 c 71
 Militia (Ireland) Act 1807 c 55
 Militia (Ireland) Act 1807 c 56
 Militia Pay, etc. (Ireland) Act 1807 c 26
 Militia Pay (Great Britain) Act 1807 c 29
 Plate Assay (Ireland) Act 1807 c 15
 Police Magistrates, Metropolis Act 1807 c 42
 Possession of Arms (Ireland) Act 1807 c 54
 Post Office Act 1807 c 53
 Post Office Act 1807 c 59
 Practice in Court of Chancery Act 1807 c 40
 Public Accountants, etc. Act 1807 c 39
 Purchase of Quays in Port of London Act 1807 c 60
 Recoveries in Copyhold, etc., Courts Act 1807 c 8
 Rectifying of Spirits (Ireland) Act 1807 c 19
 Sale of Liquors by Retail (Ireland) Act 1807 c 12
 Shorncliffe Military Canal, etc. Act 1807 c 70
 Sierra Leone Company Act 1807 c 44
 Smuggling Act 1807 c 66
 Trade Act 1807 c 38
 Treasury Bills (Ireland) Act 1807 c 72
 Treaty of Commerce, etc., with America Act 1807 c 2
 Windsor Forest Boundary Commission Act 1807 c 46
 Woollen Manufacture Act 1807 c 43

1808 (48 Geo. 3)
 Accounts of Barrack Office Act 1808 c 89
 Accounts of Expenditure in West Indies Act 1808 c 91
 Accounts of Paymaster General Act 1808 c 49
 Acts of Parliament (Expiration) Act 1808 c 106
 Advance from Bank of England Act 1808 c 3
 Advance of Unclaimed Dividends, etc. Act 1808 c 4
 Amendment of cc 26, 28 of this Session Act 1808 c 71
 Annuity to Duchess of Brunswick Wolfenbuttel Act 1808 c 59
 Annuity to Viscount Lake, etc. Act 1808 c 13
 Appropriation Act 1808 c 148
 Assessed Taxes (Ireland) Act 1808 c 42
 Assessment of Taxes Act 1808 c 141
 Bail Bonds Act 1808 c 58
 Bank of Ireland Act 1808 c 103
 Benefices Act 1808 c 5
 Benefices (Ireland) Act 1808 c 66
 Bill of Exchange Act 1808 c 88
 Bonding Warehouses (Ireland) Act 1808 c 32
 Bounties and Drawbacks Act 1808 c 16
 Bounties and Drawbacks Act 1808 c 17
 Bounties on Sugar Act 1808 c 12
 Bounty on Pilchards Act 1808 c 68
 Bringing of Coals, etc., to London, etc. Act 1808 c 95
 British Fisheries Act 1808 c 86
 British Ships Captured by the Enemy Act 1808 c 70
 Burial of Drowned Persons Act 1808 c 75
 Cape of Good Hope Trade Act 1808 c 105
 Church Building, etc. (Ireland) Act 1808 c 65
 Compensation to Patentee Officers (Ireland) Act 1808 c 108
 Counterfeiting of Tokens, etc. Act 1808 c 31
 Court of Session Act 1808 c 151
 Crown Claims Limitation (Ireland) Act 1808 c 47
 Customs Act 1808 c 9
 Customs Act 1808 c 26
 Customs Act 1808 c 28
 Customs Act 1808 c 56
 Customs Act 1808 c 57
 Customs Act 1808 c 67
 Customs and Excise (Ireland) Act 1808 c 62
 Customs (Ireland) Act 1808 c 80
 Dean and New Forests Act 1808 c 72
 Defence of the Realm Act 1808 c 107
 Discharge of Certain Imprisoned Debtors Act 1808 c 123
 Distillation of Spirits Act 1808 c 118
 Distillation of Spirits (Scotland) Act 1808 c 10
 Disused Public Buildings (Ireland) Act 1808 c 113
 Drawbacks Act 1808 c 43
 Dublin General Post Office Act 1808 c 48
 Dublin Police Magistrates Act 1808 c 140
 Duchy of Lancaster Act 1808 c 73
 Duties on Auctions (Ireland) Act 1808 c 63
 Duties on Certain Licences Act 1808 c 143
 Duties on Cinnamon, etc. Act 1808 c 18
 Duties on Malt, etc. Act 1808 c 2
 Duties on Spirits Act 1808 c 115
 Duties on Spirits Act 1808 c 119
 Duties on Spirits and Coffee Act 1808 c 120
 Duties on Spirits and Coffee Act 1808 c 121
 Duties on Spirits (Ireland) Act 1808 c 81
 Duties on Worts or Wash Act 1808 c 152
 Duties upon Silks Act 1808 c 117
 Exchequer Bills Act 1808 c 7
 Exchequer Bills Act 1808 c 53
 Exchequer Bills Act 1808 c 54
 Exchequer Bills Act 1808 c 97
 Exchequer Bills Act 1808 c 114
 Excise and Stamps Act 1808 c 41
 Excise (Ireland) Act 1808 c 82
 Exercising Ground, Chatham Act 1808 c 101
 Exportation Act 1808 c 29
 Exportation Act 1808 c 33
 Exportation Act 1808 c 34
 Exportation Act 1808 c 35
 Exportation Act 1808 c 44
 Exportation Act 1808 c 69
 Exportation and Importation Act 1808 c 27
 Exportation, etc. Act 1808 c 22
 First Meetings of Commissioners Act 1808 c 133
 Frauds by Boatmen in Cinque Ports, etc. Act 1808 c 130
 Gamekeepers Act 1808 c 93
 Grants of Offices in Reversion, etc. Act 1808 c 50
 Greenland Whale Fisheries, etc. Act 1808 c 20
 Grenada and Saint Vincent Traders Act 1808 c 135
 Hackney Coach Fares Act 1808 c 87
 Herring Fishery (Scotland) Act 1808 c 110
 Hops Act 1808 c 134
 House Tax Act 1808 c 55
 Importation Act 1808 c 11
 Importation Act 1808 c 19
 Importation Act 1808 c 23
 Importation Act 1808 c 24
 Importation Act 1808 c 125
 Indemnity Act 1808 c 40
 Inquiry into Military Departments Act 1808 c 61
 Investment of Certain Money Act 1808 c 21
 Issue and Payment of Exchequer Bills Act 1808 c 1
 Judges' Pensions (Scotland) Act 1808 c 145
 Land Tax Act 1808 c 102
 Larceny Act 1808 c 129
 Life Annuities Act 1808 c 142
 Local Militia (England) Act 1808 c 111
 Local Militia (Scotland) Act 1808 c 150
 Londonderry School Act 1808 c 77
 Lotteries Act 1808 c 139
 Lunatic Papers or Criminals Act 1808 c 96
 Malt Duties Act 1808 c 36
 Malt Duties Act 1808 c 74
 Malt Duties (Ireland) Act 1808 c 79
 Malt, etc., Duties (Ireland) Act 1808 c 78
 Management of Stock Redeemed Act 1808 c 92
 Marine Mutiny Act 1808 c 14
 Marriages Confirmation Act 1808 c 127
 Militia Allowances Act 1808 c 51
 Militia Allowances Act 1808 c 52
 Militia (Ireland) Act 1808 c 64
 Militia of Tower Hamlets Act 1808 c 136
 Militia Pay (Great Britain) Act 1808 c 46
 Militia Pay (Ireland) Act 1808 c 45
 Mutiny Act 1808 c 15
 National Debt Act 1808 c 38
 National Debt Act 1808 c 83
 National Debt Act 1808 c 76
 Oyster Fisheries (England) Act 1808 c 144
 Payment of Creditors (Scotland) Act 1808 c 25
 Pilots and Pilotage Act 1808 c 104
 Post Horse Duties Act 1808 c 98
 Postage Act 1808 c 90
 Postage Act 1808 c 116
 Prize Act 1808 c 100
 Prize Goods Act 1808 c 99
 Probate and Legacy Duties Act 1808 c 149
 Property for Barrack Service, etc. Act 1808 c 122
 Public Buildings (Scotland) Act 1808 c 146
 Purchase for Houses of Parliament Act 1808 c 137
 Quartering of Soldiers Act 1808 c 39
 Regimental Accounts Act 1808 c 128
 Removal of Goods for Exportation, etc. Act 1808 c 126
 Reprisals Against Foreign Ships, etc. Act 1808 c 132
 Sale of Prize Ship Constantia Maria Act 1808 c 147
 Shooting Hares (Scotland) Act 1808 c 94
 Smuggling, etc. Act 1808 c 84
 Southern Whale Fisheries Act 1808 c 124
 Tanners, Curriers, Shoemakers, etc. Act 1808 c 60
 Teinds Act 1808 c 138
 Trade between Ireland and East Indies Act 1808 c 30
 Trade with America Act 1808 c 85
 Trade with South America Act 1808 c 109
 Treasurer of the Navy Act 1808 c 8
 Treasury Bills (Ireland) Act 1808 c 112
 Treaty of Commerce, etc., with America Act 1808 c 6
 Validity of Certain Orders in Council, etc. Act 1808 c 37
 Woollen Manufacture Act 1808 c 131

1809 (49 Geo. 3)
 Administration of Justice (Scotland) Act 1809 c 119
 Appropriation Act 1809 c 128
 Attorneys Act 1809 c 28
 Auction Duties (Ireland) Act 1809 c 100
 Auditing of Public Accounts Act 1809 c 95
 Average Price of Brown Sugar Act 1809 c 43
 Bankrupts (England and Ireland) Act 1809 c 121
 Bastardy Act 1809 c 68
 Beer and Malt (Ireland) Act 1809 c 57
 Bounties, etc., on Sugar Act 1809 c 10
 Bounties, etc., on Sugar Act 1809 c 11
 Building of Churches, etc. (Ireland) Act 1809 c 103
 Cape of Good Hope Trade Act 1809 c 17
 Charge of Loans Act 1809 c 92
 Compassionate List of the Navy, etc. Act 1809 c 45
 Concealment of Birth (Scotland) Act 1809 c 14
 Criminal Prosecutions Fees (Ireland) Act 1809 c 101
 Customs Act 1809 c 46
 Customs Act 1809 c 65
 Customs Act 1809 c 98
 Customs and Excise (Ireland) Act 1809 c 116
 Discount on Newspapers Act 1809 c 50
 Distillation of Spirits Act 1809 c 7
 Distillation of Spirits Act 1809 c 24
 Drainage of Bogs, etc. (Ireland) Act 1809 c 102
 Dublin General Post Office Act 1809 c 70
 Duties, Drawbacks, etc. (Ireland) Act 1809 c 74
 Duties on Malt, etc. Act 1809 c 1
 Duties on Spirits (Ireland) Act 1809 c 73
 Duty on Sugar, etc. Act 1809 c 61
 Exchequer Bills Act 1809 c 2
 Exchequer Bills Act 1809 c 3
 Exchequer Bills Act 1809 c 52
 Exchequer Bills Act 1809 c 93
 Exchequer Bills Act 1809 c 114
 Excise Act 1809 c 63
 Excise Act 1809 c 77
 Excise Act 1809 c 80
 Excise Act 1809 c 81
 Excise (Great Britain) Act 1809 c 117
 Excise (Ireland) Act 1809 c 33
 Exemption from Duties Act 1809 c 44
 Exportation Act 1809 c 23
 Exportation Act 1809 c 30
 Exportation Act 1809 c 31
 Exportation (Ireland) Act 1809 c 76
 Fees in Public Offices, etc. (Ireland) Act 1809 c 51
 Flax Seed (Ireland) Act 1809 c 29
 Forgery of Bank of Ireland Notes, etc. Act 1809 c 13
 Fortifications, Portsmouth and Dover Act 1809 c 39
 Frauds by Boatmen and others, etc. Act 1809 c 122
 Friendly Societies Act 1809 c 125
 Friendly Societies (Ireland) Act 1809 c 58
 Highways (Ireland) Act 1809 c 84
 Hospitals (Ireland) Act 1809 c 36
 Importation Act 1809 c 8
 Importation Act 1809 c 9
 Importation Act 1809 c 16
 Importation Act 1809 c 25
 Importation Act 1809 c 26
 Importation Act 1809 c 60
 Importation Act 1809 c 105
 Importation, etc. Act 1809 c 18
 Importation, etc. Act 1809 c 22
 Indemnity Act 1809 c 15
 Indemnity as to Certain Books Act 1809 c 69
 Inquiry into Military Departments Act 1809 c 111
 Insolvent Debtors Relief Act 1809 c 115
 Insolvent Debtors Relief (Ireland) Act 1809 c 54
 Justice of Assize Act 1809 c 91
 Land Tax Act 1809 c 55
 Land Tax Act 1809 c 67
 Lands for the Defence of the Realm Act 1809 c 112
 Life Annuities Act 1809 c 104
 Local Militia (England) Act 1809 c 40
 Local Militia (Great Britain) Act 1809 c 82
 Local Militia (Scotland) Act 1809 c 48
 Lotteries Act 1809 c 94
 Marine Mutiny Act 1809 c 19
 Militia and Local Militia Pay (Great Britain) Act 1809 c 87
 Militia Allowances Act 1809 c 88
 Militia Allowances Act 1809 c 89
 Militia (Great Britain) Act 1809 c 4
 Militia (Great Britain) Act 1809 c 53
 Militia (Great Britain) Act 1809 c 129
 Militia (Ireland) Act 1809 c 5
 Militia (Ireland) Act 1809 c 56
 Militia (Ireland) Act 1809 c 86
 Militia (Ireland) Act 1809 c 120
 Militia Pay (Ireland) Act 1809 c 85
 Mutiny Act 1809 c 12
 National Debt Act 1809 c 21
 National Debt Act 1809 c 71
 National Debt Act 1809 c 78
 Newfoundland Act 1809 c 27
 Officers of Excise Act 1809 c 66
 Officers of Excise Act 1809 c 96
 Ordnance Services, Purfleet Act 1809 c 97
 Parliamentary Elections Act 1809 c 118
 Payment of Creditors (Scotland) Act 1809 c 38
 Penalties, etc., in British America Act 1809 c 107
 Pension Duties Act 1809 c 32. Sometimes called the Pensions Duties Act 1809.
 Pension Duties (No. 2) Act 1809 c 110
 Pensions for Naval Officers' Widows Act 1809 c 35
 Poor (Settlement and Removal) Act 1809 c 124
 Prize Act 1809 c 34
 Prize Money Act 1809 c 123
 Public Records (Scotland) Act 1809 c 42
 Quartering of Soldiers Act 1809 c 37
 Re-captured British-built Ships Act 1809 c 41
 Recognizances (Ireland) Act 1809 c 83
 Reduction of National Debt Act 1809 c 64
 Relief of Families of Militiamen (Scotland) Act 1809 c 90
 Relief of Prisoners for Debt Act 1809 c 6
 Salaries of Chief Baron, etc. Act 1809 c 127
 Sale of Offices Act 1809 c 126
 Silk Manufactures Act 1809 c 20
 Smuggling Customs Regulations, etc. Act 1809 c 62
 Spirits (Ireland) Act 1809 c 99
 Taxes on Carriages, etc. (Ireland) Act 1809 c 75
 Trade Between Europe and British America Act 1809 c 47
 Trade of Nova Scotia, etc. Act 1809 c 49
 Trade with United States Act 1809 c 59
 Treasury Bills (Ireland) Act 1809 c 79
 Volunteers and Local Militia Act 1809 c 113
 Wages and Prize Money, etc., in the Navy Act 1809 c 108
 Warehoused Goods Act 1809 c 106
 Wide Streets and Coal Trade, Dublin Act 1809 c 72
 Woollen Manufacture Act 1809 c 109

1810 – 1819

1810 (50 Geo. 3)
 Admiralty and Prize Courts Act 1810 c 118
 Annuity to Duke of Brunswick Act 1810 c 37
 Annuity to Duke of Wellington, etc. Act 1810 c 8
 Appropriation Act 1810 c 115
 Arms (Ireland) Act 1810 c 109
 Assessed Taxes Act 1810 c 104
 Baking Trade Act 1810 c 73
 Bastards Act 1810 c 51
 Black Game in Somerset and Devon Act 1810 c 67
 Bonded Warehouses (Ireland) Act 1810 c 38
 Bounty of Raw Sugar Act 1810 c 9
 Bounty on Exportation Act 1810 c 40
 Bringing of Coals, etc., to London, etc. Act 1810 c 110
 British Fisheries Act 1810 c 54
 Charges of Loan, etc., of Present Session Act 1810 c 71
 Clandestine Running of Goods, etc. Act 1810 c 10
 Clothing of the Army, etc. Act 1810 c 107
 Consumption of Malt Liquors (Ireland) Act 1810 c 46
 Cornwall Duchy Act 1810 c 6
 Court of Session Act 1810 c 112
 Crown Lands Act 1810 c 65
 Courts-Martial on Troops of East India Company Act 1810 c 87
 Customs Act 1810 c 77
 Distillation of Spirits Act 1810 c 5
 Distillation of Spirits (Scotland) Act 1810 c 79
 Duties on Malt, etc. Act 1810 c 1
 Duties on Spirits (Ireland) Act 1810 c 15
 Duty on Sugar, etc. Act 1810 c 61
 East India Company Act 1810 c 86
 Embezzlement by Collectors Act 1810 c 59
 Exchequer Bills Act 1810 c 2
 Exchequer Bills Act 1810 c 3
 Exchequer Bills Act 1810 c 69
 Exchequer Bills Act 1810 c 70
 Exchequer Bills Act 1810 c 113
 Exchequer Bills Act 1810 c 114
 Excise Officers Act 1810 c 44
 Exportation Act 1810 c 26
 Exportation Act 1810 c 34
 Exportation Act 1810 c 60
 Exportation Act 1810 c 63
 Exportation Act 1810 c 64
 Exportation and Importation (Great Britain) Act 1810 c 18
 Exportation and Importation (Great Britain) Act 1810 c 19
 Exportation and Importation (Ireland) Act 1810 c 16
 Exportation and Importation (Ireland) Act 1810 c 17
 Fees in Public Offices, etc. (Ireland) Act 1810 c 81
 Fees of Coroners (Ireland) Act 1810 c 30
 Fines on Stills (Ireland) Act 1810 c 100
 Flax and Hemp Seed (Ireland) Act 1810 c 82
 Frauds on Exportation Act 1810 c 53
 Greenland Whale Fishery Act 1810 c 11
 Government Offices Security Act 1810 c 85
 Hawkers Act 1810 c 41
 Highland Road and Bridges (Scotland) Act 1810 c 43
 Highways (Ireland) Act 1810 c 29
 Holyhead Harbour Act 1810 c 93
 Houses of Parliament Act 1810 c 119
 Howth Harbour Act 1810 c 72
 Importation Act 1810 c 55
 Importation Act 1810 c 80
 Importation and Exportation Act 1810 c 12
 Importation and Exportation Act 1810 c 13
 Importation and Exportation Act 1810 c 21
 Importation and Exportation (Ireland) Act 1810 c 97
 Income Tax, etc. Act 1810 c 106
 Indemnity Act 1810 c 4
 Insolvent Debtors (Ireland) Act 1810 c 47
 Isle of Man Customs Act 1810 c 42
 Isle of Man Smuggling Act 1810 c 62
 Land Tax Redemption Act 1810 c 58
 Lighthouses (Ireland) Act 1810 c 95
 Lotteries Act 1810 c 94
 Making of Malt, etc. (Ireland) Act 1810 c 99
 Manufactures (Great Britain) Act 1810 c 57
 Marine Mutiny Act 1810 c 14
 Militia Allowances Act 1810 c 91
 Militia Allowances Act 1810 c 92
 Militia and Local Militia Pay (Great Britain) Act 1810 c 90
 Militia (Great Britain) Act 1810 c 24
 Militia (Great Britain) Act 1810 c 25
 Militia Pay (Ireland) Act 1810 c 89
 Mutiny Act 1810 c 7
 National Debt Act 1810 c 23
 National Debt Act 1810 c 36
 National Debt Act 1810 c 45
 National Debt Act 1810 c 68
 New Forest Act 1810 c 116
 Offices in Reversion Act 1810 c 88
 Pension Duties Act 1810 c 56
 Pensions (Scotland) Act 1810 c 111
 Poor Act 1810 c 52
 Poor Rate Act 1810 c 49
 Postage Act 1810 c 66
 Postage Act 1810 c 74
 Prisage and Butlerage (Ireland) Act 1810 c 101
 Prisons (Ireland) Act 1810 c 103
 Public Salaries, etc. Act 1810 c 117
 Purchase of Quays, Port of London Act 1810 c 22
 Quarantine Act 1810 c 20
 Quartering of Soldiers Act 1810 c 28
 Quartering of Soldiers Act 1810 c 96
 Relief of the Poor Act 1810 c 50
 Repayment of Duty in Certain Cases Act 1810 c 39
 School Sites (Ireland) Act 1810 c 33
 Sea Fisheries (Scotland) Act 1810 c 108
 Session Court (Scotland) Act 1810 c 31
 Silk Manufacture (Ireland) Act 1810 c 27
 Stage Coaches, etc. (Great Britain) Act 1810 c 48
 Stage Coaches, etc. (Ireland) Act 1810 c 32
 Stamps Act 1810 c 35
 Stamps (Ireland) Act 1810 c 76
 Suppression of Insurrection, etc. (Ireland) Act 1810 c 78
 Taxes Act 1810 c 105
 Teinds Act 1810 c 84
 Treasury Bills (Ireland) Act 1810 c 98
 Unlawful Oaths (Ireland) Act 1810 c 102
 Window Duty (Ireland) Act 1810 c 75
 Woollen Manufacture Act 1810 c 83

1811 (51 Geo. 3)

Public general acts
 Advances by Bank of Ireland Act 1811 c 35
 Appropriation Act 1811 c 117
 Army Act 1811 c 106
 Arrears of Crown Rents (Ireland) Act 1811 c 91
 Assessed Taxes Act 1811 c 72
 Bogs (Ireland) Act 1811 c 122
 Bringing of Coals, etc., to London Act 1811 c 29
 British Calicoes Act 1811 c 33
 British White Herring Fishery Act 1811 c 101
 Care of King During his Illness, etc. Act 1811 c 1
 Census (Great Britain) Act 1811 c 6
 Charge of Loan Act 1811 c 61
 Cinque Ports Act 1811 c 36
 Clearance of Vessels, London Act 1811 c 24
 Coal Duty, Dublin Act 1811 c 11
 Colouring of Porter Act 1811 c 87
 Commercial Treaty with Portugal Act 1811 c 47
 Counterfeiting Bank of England Tokens Act 1811 c 110
 Counties of Cities Act 1811 c 100
 Customs Act 1811 c 52
 Customs Act 1811 c 55
 Customs Act 1811 c 71
 Customs Act 1811 c 96
 Customs Duties Act 1811 c 67
 Customs Duties Act 1811 c 68
 Deer Stealing (England) Act 1811 c 120
 Distillers of Spirits Act 1811 c 42
 Drawback of Duty on Coals Act 1811 c 83
 Drawbacks, etc., on Sugar Act 1811 c 12
 Drawbacks on Spirits Act 1811 c 121
 Duties on Certain Woods, etc. Act 1811 c 43
 Duties on Glass Act 1811 c 69
 Duties on Hats, etc., Repeal (Ireland) Act 1811 c 60
 Duties on Malt, etc. Act 1811 c 2
 Duties on Norway Timber Act 1811 c 93
 Duties on Spirits Act 1811 c 59
 Duties on Tobacco Act 1811 c 56
 Duty on Copper Act 1811 c 31
 Duty on Hats, etc., Repeal (Great Britain) Act 1811 c 70
 Duty on Linen Act 1811 c 44
 East India Company Act 1811 c 75
 East India Company Bonds Act 1811 c 64
 Embezzlement (Ireland) Act 1811 c 38
 Exchequer Bills Act 1811 c 3
 Exchequer Bills Act 1811 c 4
 Exchequer Bills Act 1811 c 15
 Exchequer Bills Act 1811 c 53
 Exchequer Bills Act 1811 c 54
 Exchequer Bills Act 1811 c 85
 Exchequer Bills Act 1811 c 112
 Excise Act 1811 c 32
 Excise, etc. Act 1811 c 95
 Exportation Act 1811 c 50
 Exportation Act 1811 c 57
 Exportation and Importation Act 1811 c 14
 Exportation and Importation Act 1811 c 86
 Fees etc., in Public Offices, etc. (Ireland) Act 1811 c 81
 Forfeited and Unclaimed Prize Money Act 1811 c 104
 Frivolous Arrests Act 1811 c 124
 General de Lancey (Estates and Crown Claims) Act 1811 c 102
 Gifts for Churches Act 1811 c 115
 Gold Currency and Bank Notes Act 1811 c 127
 Grants of Pensions Act 1811 c 21
 Highways (Ireland) Act 1811 c 40
 Highways (Ireland) Act 1811 c 92
 Horse Duty Act 1811 c 76
 Importation Act 1811 c 48
 Importation Act 1811 c 58
 Importation Act 1811 c 62
 Indemnity Act 1811 c 17
 Indemnity Act 1811 c 18
 Indemnity Act 1811 c 98
 Inquiry into Military Expenditure, etc. Act 1811 c 19
 Insolvent Debtors Relief (England) Act 1811 c 125
 Insolvent Debtors Relief (Ireland) Act 1811 c 123
 Irish Lighthouses Act 1811 c 66
 Justice of the Peace, Metropolis Act 1811 c 119
 Lotteries Act 1811 c 113
 Lunatic Paupers, etc. (England) Act 1811 c 79
 Malt, etc., Duties Act 1811 c 27
 Manufacture of Maidstone Geneva, etc. Act 1811 c 111
 Marine Mutiny Act 1811 c 9
 Marriage of Lunatics Act 1811 c 37
 Militia Act 1811 c 20
 Militia Act 1811 c 118
 Militia Act 1811 c 128
 Militia Allowances Act 1811 c 108
 Militia Allowances Act 1811 c 109
 Militia and Local Militia Pay (Great Britain) Act 1811 c 107
 Militia (Ireland) Act 1811 c 30
 Militia Pay (Ireland) Act 1811 c 90
 Militia (Stannaries) Act 1811 c 114
 Mutiny Act 1811 c 8
 National Debt Act 1811 c 16
 National Debt Act 1811 c 22
 National Debt Act 1811 c 26
 National Debt Act 1811 c 49
 Naval Arsenals Act 1811 c 73
 Parish Apprentices Act 1811 c 80
 Parliamentary Elections Act 1811 c 84
 Parliamentary Elections Act 1811 c 99
 Parliamentary Elections (Ireland) Act 1811 c 77
 Payment of Creditors (Scotland) Act 1811 c 25
 Preservation of Timber Act 1811 c 94
 Printers and Publishers Act 1811 c 65
 Prisage and Butlerage of Wines (Ireland) Act 1811 c 51
 Prisoners (Ireland) Act 1811 c 63
 Prize Goods Act 1811 c 74
 Quarantine Act 1811 c 46
 Quartering of Soldiers Act 1811 c 28
 Relief of Families of Militiamen (Ireland) Act 1811 c 78
 Retirement of Officers on Half Pay Act 1811 c 103
 Rock Salt Act 1811 c 82
 Royal Naval Asylum Act 1811 c 105
 St. John's, Newfoundland, etc. Act 1811 c 45
 Salary of Lord Lieutenant (Ireland) Act 1811 c 89
 Silk Manufacture Act 1811 c 7
 Slave Trade Felony Act 1811 c 23. Sometimes called the Slave Trade Act 1811.
 Southern Whale Fishery Act 1811 c 34
 Stealing from Bleaching Grounds (Ireland) Act 1811 c 39
 Stealing of Linen, etc. Act 1811 c 41
 Sugar Bounties, etc. Act 1811 c 13
 Tower Burial Ground Act 1811 c 116
 Trade, Europe and American Colonies Act 1811 c 97
 Treasury Bills (Ireland) Act 1811 c 5
 Treasury Bills (Ireland) Act 1811 c 88
 Westminster Parliamentary Elections Act 1811 c 126
 Wide Streets, Dublin Act 1811 c 10

Local acts

}}

1812

52 Geo. 3
 Agent General for Volunteers, etc. Act 1812 c 152
 Alice Holt Forest Act 1812 c 72
 Annuities to Princesses Act 1812 c 57
 Annuity to Duke of Wellington Act 1812 c 37
 Appeal in Revenue Cases (Ireland) Act 1812 c 78
 Application of Bounties on Linen, etc. Act 1812 c 96
 Appropriation Act 1812 c 154
 Army Act 1812 c 27
 Army Act 1812 c 120
 Assessed Taxes Act 1812 c 93
 Assessed Taxes Act 1812 c 147
 Auction Duty Act 1812 c 53
 Audit of Military Accounts (Ireland) Act 1812 c 51
 Audit of Public Accounts (Ireland) Act 1812 c 52
 Bahama Islands Trade Act 1812 c 99
 Bogs (Ireland) Act 1812 c 74
 Bounties, etc., on Sugar Act 1812 c 15
 Bounties on Pilchards Act 1812 c 42
 Bridges Act 1812 c 110
 British White Herring Fishery Act 1812 c 153
 Butter Trade (Ireland) Act 1812 c 134
 Census (Ireland) Act 1812 c 133
 Charitable Donations Registration Act 1812 c 102
 Charities Procedure Act 1812 c 101
 Chelsea Hospital Act 1812 c 109
 Civil List, During King's Illness Act 1812 c 6
 Coadjutors to Bishops in Ireland Act 1812 c 62
 Coffee, etc. Act 1812 c 149
 Colonial Trade Act 1812 c 98
 Counterfeiting Tokens, etc. Act 1812 c 138
 Crown Debt of Abraham Goldsmid, etc. Act 1812 c 75
 Customs Act 1812 c 2
 Customs Act 1812 c 60
 Customs Act 1812 c 89
 Customs Act 1812 c 117
 Customs Act 1812 c 141
 Customs, etc. (Ireland) Act 1812 c 76
 Debtors Relief Act 1812 c 34
 Debts of East India Company Act 1812 c 121
 Destruction of Stocking Frames, etc. Act 1812 c 16
 Distillation from Corn, etc. Act 1812 c 118
 Distillation (Ireland) Act 1812 c 47
 Distillation of Spirits Act 1812 c 3
 Drawback, etc., on Glass Act 1812 c 77
 Duchy of Cornwall Act 1812 c 123
 Duchy of Lancaster Act 1812 c 161
 Duties, etc., on Foreign Liquors, etc. Act 1812 c 159
 Duties on Coals, etc. Act 1812 c 9
 Duties on Glass Act 1812 c 54
 Duties on Mahogany, etc. Act 1812 c 36
 Duties on Malt, etc. Act 1812 c 1
 Duties on Spirits (Ireland) Act 1812 c 46
 Duties on Spirits (Ireland) Act 1812 c 48
 Duties on Stone Bottles Act 1812 c 139
 Duty on Salt Act 1812 c 107
 Duty of Spirits, Newfoundland Act 1812 c 106
 East India Company Act 1812 c 10
 East India Company Act 1812 c 135
 Embezzlement by Bankers, etc. Act 1812 c 63
 Embezzlement of Naval, etc., Stores Act 1812 c 12
 Exchequer Bills Act 1812 c 4
 Exchequer Bills Act 1812 c 5
 Exchequer Bills Act 1812 c 86
 Exchequer Bills Act 1812 c 114
 Exchequer Bills Act 1812 c 164
 Excise Act 1812 c 58
 Excise Act 1812 c 61
 Excise Act 1812 c 94
 Excise Act 1812 c 128
 Excise Officers Allowance Act 1812 c 81
 Exemption from Toll Act 1812 c 145
 Expenditure, etc., of Office of Works, etc. Act 1812 c 41
 Expenses of Prince Regent Act 1812 c 7
 Exportation Act 1812 c 25
 Exportation Act 1812 c 45
 Exportation Act 1812 c 140
 Family of Right Honourable Spencer Perceval Act 1812 c 67
 Fees in Public Offices, etc. (Ireland) Act 1812 c 92
 Forces of East India Company Act 1812 c 122
 Gold Currency, etc. Act 1812 c 50
 Grants of Officers Act 1812 c 40
 Hawkers Act 1812 c 108
 House of Commons (Offices) Act 1812 c 11
 Importation Act 1812 c 18
 Importation Act 1812 c 33
 Importation Act 1812 c 119
 Importation and Exportation Act 1812 c 69
 Importation and Exportation Act 1812 c 79
 Importation, etc. Act 1812 c 20
 Indemnity Act 1812 c 26
 Infant Suitors in Equity Entitled to Stock Act 1812 c 32
 Inland Excise and Taxes (Ireland) Act 1812 c 97
 Insolvent Debtors Relief (England) Act 1812 c 13
 Insolvent Debtors Relief (England) Act 1812 c 165
 Insolvent Debtors Relief (Ireland) Act 1812 c 163
 Jamaica and Saint Domingo Act 1812 c 35
 Land Tax Certificates Forgery Act 1812 c 143
 Land Tax Redemption Act 1812 c 80
 Loans or Exchequer Bills Act 1812 c 137
 Local Militia (England) Act 1812 c 38
 Local Militia (Exemption) Act 1812 c 116
 Local Militia (Scotland) Act 1812 c 68
 Lotteries Act 1812 c 19
 Lotteries Act 1812 c 125
 Malicious Damage Act 1812 c 130
 Manufacture of Starch from Wheat, etc. Act 1812 c 127
 Marine Mutiny Act 1812 c 23
 Medicines Stamp Act 1812 c 150
 Members of Parliament (Bankruptcy) Act 1812 c 144
 Militia Allowances Act 1812 c 83
 Militia Allowances Act 1812 c 84
 Militia (Ireland) Act 1812 c 29
 Militia Pay (Great Britain) Act 1812 c 111
 Militia Pay (Ireland) Act 1812 c 112
 Militia Returns Act 1812 c 105
 Mutiny Act 1812 c 22
 National Debt Act 1812 c 14
 National Debt Act 1812 c 24
 National Debt Act 1812 c 70
 National Debt Act 1812 c 85
 National Debt Commissioners Act 1812 c 129
 Obtaining Bonds, etc., Under False Pretences Act 1812 c 64
 Parochial Registers Act 1812 c 146
 Parochial Stipends (Scotland) Act 1812 c 131
 Peace Preservation (England) Act 1812 c 162
 Peace Preservation (Ireland) Act 1812 c 91
 Penitentiary House, etc. Act 1812 c 44
 Pension Duties Act 1812 c 56
 Pilotage Act 1812 c 39
 Places of Religious Worship Act 1812 c 155
 Plate (Drawback on Exportation) Act 1812 c 59
 Port of Dublin Lighthouses Act 1812 c 115
 Postage Act 1812 c 88
 Preservation of the Peace Act 1812 c 17
 Price of Coals for Poor of Dublin Act 1812 c 136
 Prisoners of War (Escape) Act 1812 c 156
 Purchase of London Quays Act 1812 c 49
 Quartering of Soldiers Act 1812 c 43
 Relief as to Transferable Stocks, etc. Act 1812 c 158
 Relief of Debtors in Prison Act 1812 c 160
 Relief of Families of Militiamen (Ireland) Act 1812 c 28
 Relief of the Poor (England) Act 1812 c 73
 Removal of Goods Act 1812 c 142
 Repeal of 39 Eliz c 17 Act 1812 c 31
 Retirement of Officers on Half Pay Act 1812 c 151
 Royal Household, etc. Act 1812 c 8
 Sale of Certain Stock Act 1812 c 148
 Security of Public Officers Act 1812 c 66
 Southern Whale Fishery Act 1812 c 103
 Stamp Duties, etc. (Ireland) Act 1812 c 87
 Stamps (Ireland) Act 1812 c 126
 Taxes (Scotland) Act 1812 c 95
 Tokens Act 1812 c 157
 Trade of Canada Act 1812 c 55
 Trade of West Indies Act 1812 c 100
 Transfer of Scotch Excise Charity, etc. Act 1812 c 82
 Treasury Bills (Ireland) Act 1812 c 90
 Treasury Bills (Ireland) Act 1812 c 113
 Unclaimed Prize Money, etc. Act 1812 c 132
 Unlawful Oaths Act 1812 c 104
 Use of Sugar in Brewing (Great Britain) Act 1812 c 65
 Validity of Certain Oaths Act 1812 c 21
 Vesting in Crown of Lands at Sandhurst Act 1812 c 124
 Warehousing of Spirits (Ireland) Act 1812 c 30
 Woolmer Forest Act 1812 c 71

53 Geo. 3
 Care of King's Estate During his Illness Act 1812 c 14
 Distillation from Corn Prohibition, etc. Act 1812 c 7
 Drawback on Chocolate Act 1812 c 11
 Duties on Malt, etc. Act 1812 c 15
 Duty on Malt Act 1812 c 9
 Duty on Rice Act 1812 c 10
 Exchequer Bills Act 1812 c 16
 Gold Currency Act 1812 c 5
 Importation and Exportation Act 1812 c 8
 Importation, etc. Act 1812 c 2
 Indemnity (Order in Council West Indies Importation) Act 1812 c 12
 Insolvent Debtors Relief (England) Act 1812 c 6
 Intercourse Between Jamaica and Saint Domingo Act 1812 c 3
 Postage Act 1812 c 13
 Purchase of Estate for Duke of Wellington Act 1812 c 4
 Use of Sugar in Brewing (Great Britain) Act 1812 c 1

1813

53 Geo. 3
 Administration of Justice Act 1813 c 24
 American Prizes Act 1813 c 63
 Appropriation Act 1813 c 136
 Arms (Ireland) Act 1813 c 78
 Audit of Accounts Act 1813 c 100
 Audit of Accounts, etc. Act 1813 c 150
 Battle-axe Guards (Ireland) Act 1813 c 54
 Bermuda Trade Act 1813 c 50
 Bridges (Ireland) Act 1813 c 77
 Bridges (Scotland) Act 1813 c 117
 Bringing of Coals to London, etc. Act 1813 c 135
 Butter Trade (Ireland) Act 1813 c 46
 Charge of Certain Annuities Act 1813 c 156
 Cinque Ports Pilots Act 1813 c 140
 Communications from Marylebone to Charing Cross Act 1813 c 121
 Consolidated Fund Act 1813 c 16
 Controverted Elections Act 1813 c 71
 Cotton Trade (Ireland) Act 1813 c 75
 Counterfeiting of Bank of Ireland Tokens Act 1813 c 106
 Court House (Ireland) Act 1813 c 131
 Court of Session Act 1813 c 64
 Customs Act 1813 c 33
 Customs Act 1813 c 47
 Customs Act 1813 c 104
 Customs Act 1813 c 105
 Diet of Soldiers on a March Act 1813 c 83
 Distillation, etc., of Spirits (Ireland) Act 1813 c 52
 Distillation of Spirits (Ireland) Act 1813 c 145
 Distillation of Spirits (Ireland) Act 1813 c 148
 Doctrine of the Trinity Act 1813 c 160
 Drawback on Coals Act 1813 c 18
 Drawback on Wines Act 1813 c 44
 Duties, etc., on Tobacco (Ireland) Act 1813 c 73
 Duties on Cape Wines Act 1813 c 84
 Duties on Carriages, etc. (Ireland) Act 1813 c 59
 Duties on Glass Act 1813 c 109
 Duties on Hides, etc. (Ireland) Act 1813 c 60
 Duties on Spirits (Great Britain) Act 1813 c 147
 Duties on Sugar Act 1813 c 62
 Duty on Malt (Ireland) Act 1813 c 74
 Duty on Spirits (Ireland) Act 1813 c 94
 East India Company Act 1813 c 155
 Ecclesiastical Courts Act 1813 c 127
 Embezzlement of Public Stores Act 1813 c 126
 Endowed Schools (Ireland) Act 1813 c 107. Sometimes called the Endowed Schools Act 1813.
 Exchequer Bills Act 1813 c 26
 Exchequer Bills Act 1813 c 27
 Exchequer Bills Act 1813 c 42
 Exchequer Bills Act 1813 c 118
 Exchequer Bills Act 1813 c 119
 Exchequer Bills, etc. Act 1813 c 161
 Excise Act 1813 c 56
 Excise Act 1813 c 57
 Excise Act 1813 c 88
 Excise Act 1813 c 103
 Exemption of Bankers from Penalties Act 1813 c 139
 Exportation Act 1813 c 30
 Exportation Act 1813 c 31
 Exportation Act 1813 c 32
 Exportation Act 1813 c 38
 Exportation Act 1813 c 45
 Exportation Act 1813 c 98
 Exportation Act 1813 c 125
 Exportation and Importation Act 1813 c 67
 Firearms Act 1813 c 115
 Frauds by Boatmen, etc. Act 1813 c 87
 Glass, etc., Duties Act 1813 c 70
 Grand Canal (Ireland) Act 1813 c 143
 Grant of John Palmer, Esquire (Post Office Services) Act 1813 c 157
 Highways (Ireland) Act 1813 c 76
 Highways (Ireland) Act 1813 c 146
 Importation Act 1813 c 34
 Importation Act 1813 c 37
 Importation and Exportation Act 1813 c 55
 Importation into Isle of Man Act 1813 c 110
 Imprisonment with Hard Labour Act 1813 c 162
 Inland Navigation (Ireland) Act 1813 c 144
 Inquiry into Public Offices (Ireland) Act 1813 c 130
 Inrolment of Grants of Annuities Act 1813 c 141
 Insolvent Debtors (England) Act 1813 c 102
 Insolvent Debtors (Ireland) Act 1813 c 138
 Issue, etc., of Gold and Silver Tokens Act 1813 c 19
 Issue, etc., of Gold and Silver Tokens Act 1813 c 114
 Judges' Pensions Act 1813 c 153
 Kilmainham Hospital (Pensions Commutation) Act 1813 c 154
 Land Tax Act 1813 c 142
 Land Tax Redemption Act 1813 c 123
 Leases of Episcopal Lands (Ireland) Act 1813 c 92
 Local Militia (England) Act 1813 c 28
 Local Militia (Ireland) Act 1813 c 48
 Lotteries Act 1813 c 93
 Maintenance of Seamen in Foreign Parts Act 1813 c 85
 Making of Starch Act 1813 c 23
 Marine Mutiny Act 1813 c 25
 Militia Act 1813 c 81
 Militia Allowances Act 1813 c 90
 Militia Allowances Act 1813 c 91
 Militia (Great Britain) Act 1813 c 20
 Militia Pay (Great Britain) Act 1813 c 96
 Militia Pay (Ireland) Act 1813 c 79
 Militia (Scotland) Act 1813 c 29
 Militia (Tower Hamlets) Act 1813 c 132
 Mutiny Act 1813 c 17
 National Debt Act 1813 c 35
 National Debt Act 1813 c 41
 National Debt Act 1813 c 53
 National Debt Act 1813 c 61
 National Debt Act 1813 c 69
 National Debt of Ireland Reduction Act 1813 c 120
 National Debt Reduction Act 1813 c 95
 Naval Compensations, etc. Act 1813 c 86
 Offences Committed by Soldiers Act 1813 c 99
 Officers' Widows' Pensions Act 1813 c 51
 Parliamentary Elections Act 1813 c 49
 Parliamentary Writs Act 1813 c 89
 Passenger Vessels Act 1813 c 36
 Payment of Creditors (Scotland) Act 1813 c 65
 Poor Prisoners Relief Act 1813 c 113
 Postage Act 1813 c 58
 Postage, etc. Act 1813 c 68
 Price, etc., of Bread Act 1813 c 116
 Prisoners for Certain Debts, etc. Act 1813 c 21
 Purchase of Estate for Duke of Wellington Act 1813 c 133
 Quartering of Soldiers Act 1813 c 43
 Registry of Admiralty Court Act 1813 c 151
 Responsibility of Shipowners Act 1813 c 159
 Roman Catholic Relief Act 1813 c 128
 Royal Canal Company (Ireland) Act 1813 c 101
 Sale of Muriate of Potash, etc. Act 1813 c 97
 Sale of Spirituous Liquors, etc. (Ireland) Act 1813 c 137
 Salt Duties Act 1813 c 22
 Salt Duty Act 1813 c 124
 Settlement of Estate on Lord Nelson Act 1813 c 134
 Sites of Parish Churches (Ireland) Act 1813 c 66
 Six Clerks in Chancery (Ireland) Act 1813 c 129
 Slave Trade Act 1813 c 112
 Southern Whale Fishery Act 1813 c 111
 Spencer Perceval's Pensions Act 1813 c 122
 Stamps Act 1813 c 108
 Stipendiary Curates Act 1813 c 149
 Stipendiary Magistrate, Manchester Act 1813 c 72
 Tolls for Certain Carriages Act 1813 c 82
 Transportation Act 1813 c 39
 Treasury Bills (Ireland) Act 1813 c 80
 Wages, etc., of Artificers, etc. Act 1813 c 40
 Westminster Election Act 1813 c 152
 Windsor Forest Act 1813 c 158

54 Geo. 3
 Accountant-General of Court of Chancery Act 1813 c 14
 Actions Against Spiritual Persons Act 1813 c 6
 Aid to Russia, etc. Act 1813 c 13
 Augmentation of 60th Regiment Act 1813 c 12
 Bounties, etc., on Sugar Act 1813 c 24
 City of London Militia Act 1813 c 17
 City of London Militia Act 1813 c 38
 Customs Act 1813 c 26
 Customs Act 1813 c 27
 Customs Act 1813 c 29
 Customs, etc. Act 1813 c 36
 Destruction of Stocking Frames, etc. Act 1813 c 42
 Distillation of Spirits (Scotland) Act 1813 c 9
 Duties on Malt, etc. Act 1813 c 2
 Duty on Salt Act 1813 c 21
 East India Trade Act 1813 c 34
 East India Trade Act 1813 c 35
 Exchequer Bills Act 1813 c 18
 Exchequer Bills Act 1813 c 39
 Exportation Act 1813 c 7
 Exportation Act 1813 c 40
 House of Commons (Disqualifications) Act 1813 c 16. Sometimes described as the House of Commons (Disqualifications) Act 1814.
 Illicit Distillation (Ireland) Act 1813 c 32
 Importation Act 1813 c 41
 Indemnity Act 1813 c 5
 Insolvent Debtors (England) Act 1813 c 23
 Insolvent Debtors Relief (England) Act 1813 c 28
 Local Militia (Great Britain) Act 1813 c 19
 Marine Mutiny Act 1813 c 31
 Militia Act 1813 c 1
 Militia Act 1813 c 10
 Militia Act 1813 c 11
 Militia Act 1813 c 20
 Mutiny Act 1813 c 25
 National Debt Act 1813 c 3
 National Debt Reduction Act 1813 c 8
 New South Wales (Debts) Act 1813 c 15
 Peace Preservation Act 1813 c 22
 Peace Preservation (Ireland) Act 1813 c 33
 Police Magistrates, Metropolis Act 1813 c 37
 Purchase for Works at Portsmouth Act 1813 c 43
 Tokens Act 1813 c 4
 Transportation Act 1813 c 30

1814

54 Geo. 3
 Accounts of Colonial Revenues Act 1814 c 184
 Accounts of Expenditure in France Act 1814 c 98
 Actions Against Spiritual Persons Act 1814 c 44
 Aliens Act 1814 c 155
 Annuities to Retired Judges (Scotland) Act 1814 c 94
 Annuity, etc., to Duke of Wellington Act 1814 c 161
 Annuity, Lord Exmouth Act 1814 c 164
 Annuity to Lord Beresford, etc. Act 1814 c 162
 Annuity to Lord Combermere, etc. Act 1814 c 163
 Annuity to Lord Hill Act 1814 c 165
 Annuity to Lord Lynedoch Act 1814 c 166
 Annuity to Princess of Wales Act 1814 c 160
 Appointment of Superintending Magistrates, etc. Act 1814 c 131
 Apprehension of Offenders Act 1814 c 186
 Apprentices Act 1814 c 96
 Appropriation Act 1814 c 167
 Army Prize Money Act 1814 c 86
 Assaults (Ireland) Act 1814 c 181
 Auction Duties (Ireland) Act 1814 c 82
 Bridges Act 1814 c 90
 British White Herring Fishery Act 1814 c 102
 Burning of Land (Ireland) Act 1814 c 115
 Burying in Woollen Act 1814 c 108
 Carriage of Gunpowder (Great Britain) Act 1814 c 152
 Child Stealing Act 1814 c 101
 Church Building (Ireland) Act 1814 c 117
 Coffee, etc. Act 1814 c 47
 Copyright Act 1814 c 156
 Corruption of Blood Act 1814 c 145
 County Infirmaries (Ireland) Act 1814 c 62
 Crown Lands Act 1814 c 70
 Customs Act 1814 c 50
 Customs Act 1814 c 64
 Customs Act 1814 c 65
 Customs Act 1814 c 66
 Customs Act 1814 c 69
 Customs Act 1814 c 77
 Customs Act 1814 c 103
 Customs Act 1814 c 122
 Customs and Excise Act 1814 c 120
 Customs and Excise Act 1814 c 121
 Customs, etc. Act 1814 c 171
 Depredations on the Thames Act 1814 c 187
 Distillation of Spirits (Ireland) Act 1814 c 150
 Drawback on Paper Act 1814 c 153
 Drawbacks on Paper Act 1814 c 106
 Dublin Foundling Hospital Act 1814 c 128
 Dublin Record Office Act 1814 c 63
 Dublin, Site of Record Office Act 1814 c 113
 Duties, etc., India Act 1814 c 105
 Duties, etc., on Glass (Ireland) Act 1814 c 87
 Duties on Glass (Great Britain) Act 1814 c 97
 Duties on Killing Game Act 1814 c 141
 Duties on Spirits (Ireland) Act 1814 c 88
 Duties on Spirits (Scotland) Act 1814 c 172
 East India Trade, etc. Act 1814 c 134
 Ecclesiastical Proctors (Ireland) Act 1814 c 68
 Embezzlement of Cordage Act 1814 c 60
 Exchequer Bills Act 1814 c 53
 Exchequer Bills Act 1814 c 79
 Exchequer Bills Act 1814 c 80
 Exchequer Bills Act 1814 c 188
 Exchequer (Ireland) Act 1814 c 83
 Excise Act 1814 c 73
 Excise Act 1814 c 148
 Excise Act 1814 c 183
 Exportation Act 1814 c 57
 Exportation Act 1814 c 100
 Exportation Act 1814 c 127
 Exportation Act 1814 c 142
 Exportation Act 1814 c 185
 Gold Currency Act 1814 c 52
 Greenwich Hospital Act 1814 c 110
 Hackney Coaches Act 1814 c 147
 Harbours Act 1814 c 159
 Highways (England) Act 1814 c 109
 Highways (Ireland) Act 1814 c 135
 Hop Trade Act 1814 c 123
 Hospitals (Ireland) Act 1814 c 112
 House Duty (Ireland) Act 1814 c 132
 Importation Act 1814 c 51
 Importation Act 1814 c 124
 Importation Act 1814 c 125
 Importation and Exportation Act 1814 c 81
 Importation and Exportation Act 1814 c 129
 Importation etc. Act 1814 c 111
 Improvement at Westminster Act 1814 c 154
 Incitement to Mutiny Act 1814 c 158
 Informal Attestation of Certain Deeds Act 1814 c 168
 Insolvent Debtors (Ireland) Act 1814 c 114
 Isle of Man Harbours Act 1814 c 143
 Judges' Pensions (Ireland) Act 1814 c 95
 Justiciary Courts (Scotland) Act 1814 c 67
 Land Tax Act 1814 c 190
 Land Tax Redemption Act 1814 c 173
 Local Militia Pay (Great Britain) Act 1814 c 176
 Lotteries Act 1814 c 74
 Manufacture of Maidstone Geneva Act 1814 c 71
 Military Roads, etc. (Scotland) Act 1814 c 104
 Militia (Ireland) Act 1814 c 179
 Militia Pay (Great Britain) Act 1814 c 189
 Militia Pay (Ireland) Act 1814 c 177
 National Debt Act 1814 c 76
 National Debt Act 1814 c 85
 National Debt Act 1814 c 139
 National Debt Act 1814 c 140
 National Debt Reduction Act 1814 c 89
 Navy Prize Money Act 1814 c 93
 Northern Lighthouse Commissioners Act 1814 c 136
 Office of Agent General for Volunteers, etc. Act 1814 c 151
 Office of Works Act 1814 c 157
 Payment of Creditors (Scotland) Act 1814 c 137
 Poor Apprentices, etc. Act 1814 c 107
 Poor Law (Overseers) Act 1814 c 91
 Poor Relief Act 1814 c 170
 Postage Act 1814 c 119
 Postage Act 1814 c 169
 Post Horse Duties, etc. (Great Britain) Act 1814 c 174
 Probate and Legacy Duties (Ireland) Act 1814 c 92
 Protection of Trade During Hostilities Act 1814 c 58
 Public Office in Colony Act 1814 c 61
 Purchase of Legal Quays, Port of London Act 1814 c 45
 Quarter Sessions Act 1814 c 84
 Quartering of Soldiers Act 1814 c 55
 Queensferry, Firth of Forth: Finance Act 1814 c 138
 Recovery of Wages (Ireland) Act 1814 c 116
 Relief of Shipwrecked Mariners, etc. Act 1814 c 126
 Removal of Wool Act 1814 c 78
 Residence on Benefices, etc. (England) Act 1814 c 175
 Restriction on Cash Payments Act 1814 c 99
 Restriction on Cash Payments Act 1814 c 130
 Sculpture Copyright Act 1814 c 56
 Slave Trade Act 1814 c 59
 Spirit Trade Act 1814 c 149
 Stamps Act 1814 c 144
 Stamps (Great Britain) Act 1814 c 133
 Stamps (Ireland) Act 1814 c 118
 Suits Against Spiritual Persons Act 1814 c 54
 Trade Act 1814 c 72
 Trade of Malta, etc. Act 1814 c 182
 Trade of West Indies Act 1814 c 48
 Trade of West Indies, etc. Act 1814 c 49
 Treason Act 1814 c 146
 Treasury Bills (Ireland) Act 1814 c 75
 Unlawful Combinations (Ireland) Act 1814 c 180
 Writs of Assistance Act 1814 c 46
 Yeomanry Corps, etc. (Ireland) Act 1814 c 178

55 Geo. 3
 Customs Act 1814 c 14
 Duties on Glass, etc. (Ireland) Act 1814 c 7
 Duties on Malt, etc. Act 1814 c 3
 Duties upon East India Goods Act 1814 c 10
 Exchequer Bills Act 1814 c 4
 Exchequer Bills Act 1814 c 5
 Importation, etc. Act 1814 c 8
 Importation, etc. Act 1814 c 9
 National Debt Act 1814 c 2
 Negotiation of Notes and Bills Act 1814 c 6
 Pensions to Seamen, etc. Act 1814 c 1
 Privileges of Foreign Ships, etc. Act 1814 c 11
 Superintending Magistrates, etc. (Ireland) Act 1814 c 13
 Unlawful Distillation, etc. (Ireland) Act 1814 c 12

1815 (55 Geo. 3)
 Account of Civil List Revenues Act 1815 c 15
 Admiralty (Signal Stations) Act 1815 c 128
 Agent General for Volunteers, etc. Act 1815 c 170
 Aliens Act 1815 c 54
 Allowance of Duty to Meux and Company Act 1815 c 189
 Allowances to Foreign Officers Act 1815 c 126
 Annuity to Lord Walsingham Act 1815 c 18
 Apothecaries Act 1815 c 194
 Appropriation Act 1815 c 187
 Assaults (Ireland) Act 1815 c 88
 Assessed Taxes (Ireland) Act 1815 c 61
 Assessed Taxes (Ireland) Act 1815 c 67
 Assessed Taxes (Ireland) Act 1815 c 140
 Auction Duties Act 1815 c 142
 Bleaching Powder Act 1815 c 38
 Brecknock Forest Act 1815 c 190
 Bridges Act 1815 c 143
 Bringing of Coal to London, etc. Act 1815 c 175
 Brown Linen Manufacture (Ireland) Act 1815 c 25
 Census (Ireland) Act 1815 c 120
 Chaplains in Goals, etc. (England) Act 1815 c 48
 Chelsea and Greenwich Hospitals Act 1815 c 133
 Chelsea Hospital Act 1815 c 125
 Commissary Court of Edinburgh Act 1815 c 97
 Compensation for Works at Portsmouth Act 1815 c 123
 Conveyance of Prisoners (Ireland) Act 1815 c 158
 County Rates Act 1815 c 51
 Court Houses (Ireland) Act 1815 c 89
 Court of Session (Records) Act 1815 c 70
 Criminal Costs (Dublin) Act 1815 c 91
 Crown Pre-emption of Lead Ore Act 1815 c 134
 Customs Act 1815 c 22
 Customs Act 1815 c 23
 Customs Act 1815 c 32
 Customs Act 1815 c 33
 Customs Act 1815 c 36
 Customs Act 1815 c 52
 Customs Act 1815 c 95
 Customs Act 1815 c 135
 Customs Act 1815 c 163
 Customs Act 1815 c 174
 Customs Act 1815 c 181
 Customs and Excise Act 1815 c 118
 Customs, etc. Act 1815 c 82
 Customs, etc. Act 1815 c 83
 Customs (Ireland) Act 1815 c 24
 Discovery of Longitude at Sea Act 1815 c 75
 Disposition of Copyhold Estates by Will Act 1815 c 192
 Distillation of Spirits (Ireland) Act 1815 c 151
 Downpatrick Election Committee Act 1815 c 98
 Drawbacks, etc., on Tobacco, etc. Act 1815 c 129
 Dublin Harbour Act 1815 c 191
 Duke of Wellington, Purchase of Estate for Act 1815 c 186
 Duties, etc., on Glass, etc. Act 1815 c 113
 Duties on Epsom Salts Act 1815 c 162
 Duties on Hides, etc. Act 1815 c 105
 Duties on Leather Act 1815 c 102
 Duties on Malt (Ireland) Act 1815 c 99
 Duties on Paper (Ireland) Act 1815 c 112
 Duties on Property, etc. (Great Britain) Act 1815 c 53
 Duties on Spirits, etc. (Scotland) Act 1815 c 155
 Duties on Spirits (Ireland) Act 1815 c 111
 Duties on Sweets, etc. (Ireland) Act 1815 c 110
 Duty on Foreign Spirits Act 1815 c 164
 Duty on Paper Hangings, etc. (Ireland) Act 1815 c 106
 Duty on Silk Handkerchiefs Act 1815 c 93
 Duty on Spirits (Ireland) Act 1815 c 139
 Duty on Tiles Act 1815 c 176
 East India Company Act 1815 c 64
 Embezzlement of Public Stores Act 1815 c 127
 Enlistment of Foreigners Act 1815 c 85
 Evidence (Ireland) Act 1815 c 157
 Exchequer Bills Act 1815 c 148
 Exchequer Bills Act 1815 c 149
 Exchequer Bills (Great Britain) Act 1815 c 196
 Excise Act 1815 c 27
 Excise Act 1815 c 30
 Excise Act 1815 c 35
 Excise Act 1815 c 62
 Excise Act 1815 c 63
 Excise and Customs Act 1815 c 66
 Exmoor Forest Act 1815 c 138
 Exportation Act 1815 c 180
 Exportation Act 1815 c 183
 Exportation and Importation Act 1815 c 31
 Exportation and Importation Act 1815 c 37
 Firearms Act 1815 c 59
 Flax, etc., Manufacture (Great Britain) Act 1815 c 178
 Frauds in Manufacture of Sweets Act 1815 c 177
 Gaol Fees Abolition Act 1815 c 50
 Glamorganshire Election Act 1815 c 72
 Glebe Exchange Act 1815 c 147
 Government Contractors Act 1815 c 195
 Grant of Feu Duties to John Francis Erskine Act 1815 c 188
 Greenland Whale Fisheries Act 1815 c 39
 Greenwich Hospital Act 1815 c 56
 Hackney Carriages Act 1815 c 159
 Half Pay of Officers, etc. Act 1815 c 131
 Hawkers (Scotland) Act 1815 c 71
 Herring Fishery (Scotland) Act 1815 c 94
 Highways, etc. (England) Act 1815 c 68
 Holyhead Roads Act 1815 c 152
 Importation Act 1815 c 26 known as the "Corn Law"
 Importation Act 1815 c 34
 Importation Act 1815 c 86
 Importation and Exportation Act 1815 c 117
 Inciting to Mutiny, etc. Act 1815 c 171
 Indemnity Act 1815 c 17
 Indian Presidency Towns Act 1815 c 84
 Inland Navigation (Ireland) Act 1815 c 182
 Intoxicating Liquors (Ireland) Act 1815 c 19. Sometimes called the Excise Duties and Licences (Ireland) Act 1815.
 Jury Trials (Scotland) Act 1815 c 42
 Kilmainham Hospital Act 1815 c 136
 Land Revenue of the Crown Act 1815 c 55
 Land, Tax, etc. Act 1815 c 150
 Limitation of Time (Ireland) (Canal Companies) Act 1815 c 90
 Loan from Bank of England Act 1815 c 16
 Local Militia (Great Britain) Act 1815 c 76
 Local Militia Pay (Great Britain) Act 1815 c 166
 Lord Nelson, Purchase of Estate for Act 1815 c 96
 Lotteries Act 1815 c 73
 Madhouses (Scotland) Act 1815 c 69
 Marine Mutiny Act 1815 c 21
 Military Roads, etc. (Scotland) Act 1815 c 121
 Militia Act 1815 c 77
 Militia Act 1815 c 168
 Militia (Medical Examination) Act 1815 c 65
 Militia Pay (Great Britain) Act 1815 c 165
 Militia Pay (Ireland) Act 1815 c 167
 Mutiny Act 1815 c 20
 Mutiny Act 1815 c 108
 National Debt Act 1815 c 58
 National Debt Act 1815 c 74
 National Debt Act 1815 c 124
 National Debt Act 1815 c 169
 Pauper, etc., Lunatics (England) Act 1815 c 46
 Payment of Forces Abroad Act 1815 c 130
 Pilotage of Foreign Vessels Act 1815 c 87
 Plate Duties Act 1815 c 185
 Poor (England) Act 1815 c 47
 Poor Relief Act 1815 c 137
 Postage Act 1815 c 103
 Postage Act 1815 c 153
 Postal Service Act 1815 c 145
 Prisoners from Clackmanan Act 1815 c 109
 Prisons (Ireland) Act 1815 c 92
 Prize, etc. Act 1815 c 160
 Prize Vessels, etc. (Ireland) Act 1815 c 44
 Protection of Trade Act 1815 c 173
 Purchases for Docks, etc., Dublin Act 1815 c 144
 Quartering of Soldiers Act 1815 c 154
 Registry of Ships Built in India Act 1815 c 116
 Restriction on Cash Payments Act 1815 c 28
 Restriction on Cash Payments Act 1815 c 41
 Return of Persons Committed, etc. Act 1815 c 49
 Richmond Lunatic Asylum (Ireland) Act 1815 c 107
 Russian Dutch Loan Act 1815 c 115
 Salt Duty Act 1815 c 179
 South Sea Company Act 1815 c 57
 South Sea Company's Privileges Act 1815 c 141
 Southern Whale Fishery Act 1815 c 45
 Spirits (Ireland) (No. 2) Act 1815 c 104
 Stamp Act 1815 c 184
 Stamp Duties (Ireland) Act 1815 c 100
 Stamps Act 1815 c 101
 Stamps (Ireland) Act 1815 c 78
 Stamps (Ireland) Act 1815 c 79
 Stamps (Ireland) Act 1815 c 80
 Stamps (Ireland) Act 1815 c 81
 Support of Captured Slaves Act 1815 c 172
 Supreme Court (Ireland) (Master of the Rolls) Act 1815 c 114
 Taxes (Scotland) Act 1815 c 161
 Trade in Spirits Act 1815 c 132
 Trade of Malta Act 1815 c 29
 Trade with French Colonies Act 1815 c 146
 Trade with United States Act 1815 c 193
 Transportation Act 1815 c 156
 Treasury Bills (Ireland) Act 1815 c 40
 Turnpike Roads Act 1815 c 119
 Weights and Measures Act 1815 c 43
 Wills, etc., of Seamen, etc. Act 1815 c 60
 Windsor Forest Act 1815 c 122

1816 (56 Geo. 3)
 Advance by Bank of England Act 1816 c 7
 Advance by Bank of England Act 1816 c 14
 Advance of Unclaimed Dividends, etc. Act 1816 c 97
 Aliens Act 1816 c 86
 Appropriation Act 1816 c 142
 Arrears of Crown, etc. Rents (Ireland) Act 1816 c 71
 Assessed Taxes Act 1816 c 66
 Assessed Taxes, etc. (Ireland) Act 1816 c 57
 Bank of England (Advance) Act 1816 c 96
 Bankrupts (England) Act 1816 c 137
 Beer Act 1816 c 58
 Beer, etc., Licences (Great Britain) Act 1816 c 113
 Bounty on Sugar Act 1816 c 19
 Bringing of Coals to London, etc. Act 1816 c 124
 British Museum Act 1816 c 99
 Burial Ground Act 1816 c 141
 Canals (Ireland) Act 1816 c 55
 Cape of Good Hope Trade Act 1816 c 8
 Civil List Audit Act 1816 c 46
 Claremont Estate Purchase (Grant of Life Interest) Act 1816 c 115
 Coin Act 1816 c 68
 Commerce with United States Act 1816 c 15
 Commerce with United States Act 1816 c 51
 Consolidated Fund Act 1816 c 98
 County Rates Act 1816 c 49
 Court of Exchequer (Ireland) Act 1816 c 122
 Crinan Canal (Scotland) Act 1816 c 135
 Custody of Insane Persons Act 1816 c 117
 Custody of Napoleon Buonaparte Act 1816 c 22
 Customs Act 1816 c 35
 Customs Act 1816 c 77
 Customs Act 1816 c 93
 Customs and Excise Act 1816 c 85
 Customs and Excise (Ireland) Act 1816 c 20
 Customs, etc. Act 1816 c 29
 Distillation of Spirits (Ireland) Act 1816 c 112
 Dublin Harbour Act 1816 c 62
 Duties, etc., on Soap Act 1816 c 44
 Duties on Foreign Packets Act 1816 c 9
 Duties on Glass (Great Britain) Act 1816 c 1
 Duties on Madder Act 1816 c 69
 Duties on Malt, etc. Act 1816 c 3
 Duties on Malt, etc. Act 1816 c 43
 Duties on Paper (Ireland) Act 1816 c 78
 Duties on Property, etc. Act 1816 c 65
 Duties on Rape Seed, etc. Act 1816 c 75
 Duties on Rape Seed, etc. Act 1816 c 79
 Duties on Spirits, etc. (Scotland) Act 1816 c 106
 Duties on Spirits (Ireland) Act 1816 c 111
 Duty on Certain Coals Act 1816 c 134
 Duty on Corks Act 1816 c 34
 Duty on Lead (Great Britain) Act 1816 c 18
 Duty on Malt (Ireland) Act 1816 c 59
 Duty on Oil, etc. Act 1816 c 118
 Duty on Paper Act 1816 c 103
 Exchequer Bills Act 1816 c 4
 Exchequer Bills Act 1816 c 28
 Exchequer Bills Act 1816 c 54
 Excise Act 1816 c 17
 Excise Act 1816 c 104
 Excise Act 1816 c 108
 Excise, etc. Act 1816 c 30
 Exercise of Trades by Soldiers, etc. Act 1816 c 67
 Exportation Act 1816 c 76
 Exportation Act 1816 c 92
 Exportation Act 1816 c 109
 Exportation Act 1816 c 127
 Glebe Exchange Act 1816 c 52
 Grand Jury (Ireland) Act 1816 c 87
 Habeas Corpus Act 1816 c 100 (aka Serjeant Onslow's Act)
 Holyhead Harbour Act 1816 c 84
 Importation Act 1816 c 2
 Importation Act 1816 c 25
 Importation Act 1816 c 26
 Importation Act 1816 c 36
 Importation Act 1816 c 37
 Indemnity Act 1816 c 33
 Insolvent Debtors (England) Act 1816 c 102
 Insolvent Debtors (Ireland) Act 1816 c 126
 Intercourse with Saint Helena Act 1816 c 23
 Inventories (Scotland) Act 1816 c 107
 Lands at Sheerness and Chatham Act 1816 c 74
 Lands of Hertford College Act 1816 c 136
 Local Militia Ballot Suspension Act 1816 c 38
 Local Militia Pay (Great Britain) Act 1816 c 45
 Lotteries Act 1816 c 61
 Malicious Damage (Scotland) Act 1816 c 125
 Marine Mutiny Act 1816 c 11
 Marylebone Park Paving, etc. Act 1816 c 128
 Militia Act 1816 c 64
 Militia Pay (Ireland) Act 1816 c 121
 Militia Pay (Great Britain) Act 1816 c 90
 Millbank Penitentiary Act 1816 c 63
 Mutiny Act 1816 c 10
 Mutiny Acts Amendment Act 1816 c 119
 National Debt Act 1816 c 133
 National Debt Commissioners Act 1816 c 53
 National Debt Redemption (Ireland) Act 1816 c 70
 National Debt Reduction Act 1816 c 60
 National Debt Reduction Act 1816 c 89
 Naturalization of Prince Leopald Act 1816 c 12
 Naturalization of Prince Leopald Act 1816 c 13
 Naval Courts-martial Act 1816 c 5
 Naval Officers' Half Pay Act 1816 c 101
 Naval Stores Act 1816 c 80
 Negotiation of Notes and Bills Act 1816 c 21
 Night Poaching Act 1816 c 130
 Oil of Vitriol Act 1816 c 81
 Parish Apprentices Act 1816 c 139
 Passenger Traffic, Newfoundland, etc. Act 1816 c 83
 Peace Preservation Act 1816 c 131
 Pillory Abolition Act 1816 c 138
 Prisoner Act 1816 c 116
 Prisoners Returns (Ireland) Act 1816 c 120
 Probate Duty (Ireland) Act 1816 c 56
 Provision for Princess Charlotte, etc. Act 1816 c 24
 Quartering of Soldiers Act 1816 c 32
 Receiver of Crown Rents Act 1816 c 16
 Recovery of Tenements, etc. (Ireland) Act 1816 c 88
 Residence on Benefices, etc. (England) Act 1816 c 6
 Residence on Benefices, etc. (England) Act 1816 c 123
 Restriction on Cash Payments Act 1816 c 40
 Restriction on Cash Payments Act 1816 c 48
 Sale of Farming Stock Act 1816 c 50
 Salt Duty Act 1816 c 94
 Shipping Act 1816 c 114
 Sikes' Hydrometer Act 1816 c 140
 Stealing Property from Mines Act 1816 c 73
 Trade of Demerara, etc. Act 1816 c 91
 Trade in Spirits Act 1816 c 105
 Trades of Tanners and Curriers Act 1816 c 110
 Transfer of Contracts, etc. Act 1816 c 31
 Transfer of Stock of Hertford College Act 1816 c 95
 Transportation Act 1816 c 27
 Treasury Bills (Ireland) Act 1816 c 41
 Treasury Bills (Ireland) Act 1816 c 42
 Treasury Bills (Ireland) Act 1816 c 47
 Vice-Admiralty Courts Act 1816 c 82
 Windsor Forest Act 1816 c 132
 Workhouse Act 1816 c 129
 Yeomanry Corps (Ireland) Act 1816 c 72
 Yeomanry (Training) Act 1816 c 39

1817 (57 Geo. 3)
 Abolition of a Certain Subsidy Act 1817 c 109
 Abolition of Certain Officers of Royal Forests Act 1817 c 61
 Allegiance of Sea and Land Forces Act 1817 c 7
 Annuity to Lord Colchester, etc. Act 1817 c 47
 Appropriation Act 1817 c 132
 Arms (Ireland) Act 1817 c 21
 Army Prize Money, etc. Act 1817 c 77
 Asylums for Lunatic Poor (Ireland) Act 1817 c 106
 Board of Trade Act 1817 c 66
 Bounties on Sugar Act 1817 c 43
 Bringing of Coals to London, etc. Act 1817 c 114
 Cape of Good Hope, etc. Trade Act 1817 c 1
 Charities, etc. (England) Act 1817 c 39
 Civil Service Pensions Act 1817 c 65
 Clerks of the Peace (Fees) Act 1817 c 91
 Coffee, etc. Act 1817 c 8
 Comptroller of Barrack Department Act 1817 c 9
 Consolidated Fund, etc. Act 1817 c 48
 Continuation of Persons in Offices, etc. Act 1817 c 45
 County Rates (England) Act 1817 c 94
 Court of Exchequer Act 1817 c 60
 Court of Exchequer (England) Act 1817 c 18
 Court of King's Bench Act 1817 c 11
 Customs and Excise Act 1817 c 116
 Deserted Tenements Act 1817 c 52
 Destroying Stocking Frames, etc. Act 1817 c 126
 Dissenters (Ireland) Act 1817 c 70
 Distillation (Scotland) Act 1817 c 40
 Distress (Costs) Act 1817 c 93
 Drawback on Paper Act 1817 c 76
 Duchy of Lancaster Act 1817 c 97
 Duties on Buckwheat Act 1817 c 27
 Duties on Malt, etc. Act 1817 c 5
 Duties on Spirits, etc. Act 1817 c 33
 Duties on Spirits (Ireland) Act 1817 c 110
 Duties on Stone Bottles Act 1817 c 32
 Duties on Coals, etc. Act 1817 c 96
 Duty on Stone Bottles Act 1817 c 119
 Duty on Sweets, etc. Act 1817 c 111
 East India Company Act 1817 c 120
 Exchequer Bills Act 1817 c 2
 Exchequer Bills Act 1817 c 16
 Exchequer Bills Act 1817 c 80
 Excise Act 1817 c 49
 Excise Act 1817 c 123
 Excise Drawback Act 1817 c 87
 Exportation Act 1817 c 15
 Exportation Act 1817 c 17
 Exportation Act 1817 c 58
 Exportation Act 1817 c 73
 Exportation from the Bahamas Act 1817 c 42
 Extents in Aid Act 1817 c 117
 Fullers Earth, etc. Act 1817 c 88
 Gibraltar Trade Act 1817 c 4
 Grand Jury Presentments (Ireland) Act 1817 c 107
 Habeas Corpus Suspension Act 1817 c 3
 Habeas Corpus Suspension Act 1817 c 55
 Hackney Coach Licences Act 1817 c 125
 House Tax Act 1817 c 25
 Importation Act 1817 c 23
 Importation Act 1817 c 85
 Importation Act 1817 c 86
 Importation Act 1817 c 89
 Indemnity Act 1817 c 14
 Jamaica, etc., Trade Act 1817 c 74
 Land Tax Redemption Act 1817 c 100
 Lotteries Act 1817 c 31
 Manor of Rialton and Retraighe Act 1817 c 129
 Marine Mutiny Act 1817 c 13
 Marriages, Newfoundland Act 1817 c 51
 Militia Act 1817 c 57
 Militia (Ireland) Act 1817 c 104
 Militia Pay (Great Britain) Act 1817 c 102
 Militia Pay (Ireland) Act 1817 c 103
 Millbank Prison, Road to Act 1817 c 54
 Mint Act 1817 c 67
 Murders Abroad Act 1817 c 53
 Mutiny Act 1817 c 12
 Mutiny Act 1817 c 35
 National Debt Act 1817 c 82
 National Debt Act 1817 c 83
 National Debt Commissioners Act 1817 c 26
 Navigation Laws Act 1817 c 95
 Navy, etc. Bills Act 1817 c 30
 Navy Prize Money, etc. Act 1817 c 118
 Night Poaching Act 1817 c 90
 Oaths, Land and Sea Forces Act 1817 c 92
 Office of Treasurer of the Navy Act 1817 c 112
 Offices of Clerks of the Signet, etc. Act 1817 c 63
 Offices of Exchequer Act 1817 c 84
 Parliamentary Elections (Ireland) Act 1817 c 131
 Passenger Vessels Act 1817 c 10
 Pay of Naval Officers Act 1817 c 20
 Paymaster General Act 1817 c 41
 Payment of Colliers' Wages Act 1817 c 122
 Payment of Cutters' Wages Act 1817 c 115
 Peace Preservation Act 1817 c 38
 Peace Preservation (Ireland) Act 1817 c 50
 Post Horse Duties Act 1817 c 59
 Prisoners (Ireland) Act 1817 c 71
 Prize Money, etc. Act 1817 c 127
 Public Offices (Ireland) Act 1817 c 62
 Public Offices (Scotland) Act 1817 c 64
 Public Works Loans Act 1817 c 34
 Public Works Loans Act 1817 c 124
 Quartering of Soldiers Act 1817 c 78
 Recognisances (Ireland) Act 1817 c 56
 Regents Park, Regent Street, etc. Act 1817 c 24
 Residence on Benefices, etc. (England) Act 1817 c 99
 Saint Marylebone Rectory, Purchase of Act 1817 c 98
 Savings Bank (England) Act 1817 c 130
 Savings Banks (Ireland) Act 1817 c 105
 Sea Fisheries (Ireland) Act 1817 c 69
 Seditious Meetings Act 1817 c 19
 Sheriffs (Ireland) Act 1817 c 68
 Superintending Magistrates, etc. (Ireland) Act 1817 c 22
 Tokens Act 1817 c 46
 Tokens Act 1817 c 113
 Tolls (Ireland) Act 1817 c 108
 Trade, America, etc. Act 1817 c 29
 Trade Between Bermuda and America Act 1817 c 28
 Trade, East Indies and Mediterranean Act 1817 c 36
 Trade in Spirits Act 1817 c 72
 Transfer of Stocks Act 1817 c 79
 Treason Act 1817 c 6
 Treasurer of the Navy, etc. Act 1817 c 121
 Treasury Bills (Ireland) Act 1817 c 81
 Turnpike Roads Act 1817 c 37
 Vexatious Arrests Act 1817 c 101
 Whipping of Female Offenders, Abolition Act 1817 c 75
 Window Duties (Scotland) Act 1817 c 128
 Yeomanry Act 1817 c 44

1818 (58 Geo. 3)

Public general acts
 Aliens Act 1818 c 96
 Aliens Act 1818 c 97
 Annuities to Duke, etc., of Kent Act 1818 c 53
 Annuities to Royal Family Act 1818 c 24
 Annuity to Duchess of Cumberland Act 1818 c 25
 Apprehension of Suspected Persons, etc. Act 1818 c 6
 Appropriation Act 1818 c 101
 Army Act 1818 c 92
 Assessed Taxes Act 1818 c 16
 Assessed Taxes Act 1818 c 17
 Assessed Taxes (Ireland) Act 1818 c 54
 Attendance of Magistrates on Board Vessels Act 1818 c 89
 Auction Duties (Ireland) Act 1818 c 79
 Brecknock Forest Act 1818 c 99
 Bringing of Coals to London, etc. Act 1818 c 62
 Care of the King During his Illness, etc. Act 1818 c 90
 Chelsea etc., Hospitals Act 1818 c 74
 Church Building Act 1818 c 45
 Circulation of Tokens, etc. Act 1818 c 14
 Confirmation of Marriages in India Act 1818 c 84
 Costs Act 1818 c 30
 Court Houses (Ireland) Act 1818 c 31
 Crown Lands at Yarmouth Act 1818 c 42
 Discovery of Longitude at Sea, etc. Act 1818 c 20
 Disorderly Houses Act 1818 c 70
 Disposition of Certain Money (Ireland) Act 1818 c 46
 Dunmore Harbour Act 1818 c 72
 Duties on Corks Act 1818 c 18
 Duties on Glass Act 1818 c 21
 Duties on Madder Act 1818 c 9
 Duties on Madder Act 1818 c 55
 Duties on Malt, etc. Act 1818 c 3
 Duties on Malt, etc. (Ireland) Act 1818 c 78
 Duties on Paper (Ireland) Act 1818 c 41
 Duties on Salt Act 1818 c 77
 Duties on Spirits, etc. (Scotland) Act 1818 c 50
 Duties on Vinegar Act 1818 c 65
 Election of Coroners (England) Act 1818 c 95
 Exchequer Bills Act 1818 c 4
 Exchequer Bills Act 1818 c 86
 Exportation Act 1818 c 34
 Exportation Act 1818 c 56
 Fees for Pardons Act 1818 c 29. Sometimes called the Fees of Pardons Act.
 Frauds in Sale of Grain (Ireland) Act 1818 c 82
 Glasgow-Carlisle Road Act 1818 c 44
 Glass Duties Act 1818 c 33
 Grand Jury Presentments (Ireland) Act 1818 c 2
 Grand Jury Presentments (Ireland) Act 1818 c 67
 Greenland Fisheries Act 1818 c 15
 Habeas Corpus Suspension Act 1818 c 1
 Hiring of Ships by East India Company Act 1818 c 83
 Hospitals (Ireland) Act 1818 c 47
 Houses of Correction (England) Act 1818 c 32
 Howth Harbour Act 1818 c 61
 Importation Act 1818 c 27
 Importation Act 1818 c 63
 Importation and Exportation Act 1818 c 19
 Indemnity Act 1818 c 5
 Indemnity, Importation and Exportation Act 1818 c 7
 Infant Executors (Ireland) Act 1818 c 81
 Inquiry Concerning Charities (England) Act 1818 c 91
 Kilmainham Hospital Act 1818 c 8
 Larceny (Ireland) Act 1818 c 68
 Licensed Grocers (Ireland) Act 1818 c 57
 Lotteries Act 1818 c 71
 Marine Mutiny Act 1818 c 12
 Militia Pay (Great Britain) Act 1818 c 58
 Militia Pay (Ireland) Act 1818 c 59
 Mutiny Act 1818 c 11
 Mutiny Act Amendment, etc. Act 1818 c 10
 National Debt Act 1818 c 23
 National Debt Commissioners Act 1818 c 66
 Naval Prize Money, etc. Act 1818 c 64
 Payment of Regimental Debts Act 1818 c 73
 Payment of Workmen's Wages Act 1818 c 51
 Peace Preservation Act 1818 c 52
 Preservation of Game Act 1818 c 75
 Public Works Loans Act 1818 c 88
 Quartering of Soldiers Act 1818 c 22
 Recovery of Tenements, etc. (Ireland) Act 1818 c 39
 Relief of Sailors Abroad Act 1818 c 38
 Relief to Holders of Certain Securities Act 1818 c 93
 Restriction on Cash Payments Act 1818 c 37
 Restriction on Cash Payments Act 1818 c 60
 Retailing of Spirits (Scotland) Act 1818 c 13
 Royal Canal Act 1818 c 35
 Salmon Fisheries (England) Act 1818 c 43
 Savings Bank (England) Act 1818 c 48
 Sea Fisheries (Ireland) Act 1818 c 94
 Sherwood Forest Act 1818 c 100
 Slave Trade Act 1818 c 36
 Slave Trade Act 1818 c 49
 Slave Trade Act 1818 c 85
 Slave Trade Act 1818 c 98
 Smuggling, etc. Act 1818 c 76
 Spirits (Strength Ascertainment) Act 1818 c 28
 Trade in Spirits Act 1818 c 26
 Transfer of Stocks Act 1818 c 80
 Treasury Bills (Ireland) Act 1818 c 87
 Vestries Act 1818 c 69
 Yeomanry Corps. (Ireland) Act 1818 c 40

Local acts
 Sheffield Improvement Act 1818 c liv

1819

59 Geo. 3
 Accounts of Colonial Revenues Act 1819 c 67
 Aliens Act 1819 c 8
 Allowance to Navy Agents Act 1819 c 119
 Appeal of Murder, etc. Act 1819 c 46
 Apprehension of Smugglers Act 1819 c 6
 Appropriation Act 1819 c 133
 Assessed Taxes Act 1819 c 13
 Assessed Taxes Act 1819 c 51
 Assessed Taxes Act 1819 c 118
 Bank of England Act 1819 c 76
 Barnstaple Elections Act 1819 c 47
 Benefices Act 1819 c 40
 Bounties on Pilchards Act 1819 c 77
 Bread Act 1819 c 36
 Bringing of Coals, etc., to London, etc. Act 1819 c 79
 Building, etc., of Gaols (Scotland) Act 1819 c 61
 Care of the King During his Illness Act 1819 c 1
 Charities Inquiry (England) Act 1819 c 81
 Charity Estates (England) Act 1819 c 91
 Church Building Act 1819 c 134
 Claims of British Subjects on France Act 1819 c 31
 Common Recoveries, etc. Act 1819 c 80
 Contagious Diseases (Ireland) Act 1819 c 41
 Contribution of Marquis Camden Act 1819 c 43
 Conveyance of Offenders (Ireland) Act 1819 c 92
 Cotton Mills, etc. Act 1819 c 66
 Court of Exchequer (Ireland) Act 1819 c 93
 Court of Session Act 1819 c 45
 Courts of Quarter Sessions Act 1819 c 28
 Crown Land Act 1819 c 94
 Customs Act 1819 c 15
 Customs Act 1819 c 33
 Customs Act 1819 c 52
 Customs Act 1819 c 78
 Customs Act 1819 c 83
 Customs Act 1819 c 123
 Cutlery Trade Act 1819 c 7
 Dean Forest Act 1819 c 86
 Distillation of Spirits (Ireland) Act 1819 c 98
 Drawback on Coals Act 1819 c 126
 Duelling (Scotland) Act 1819 c 70
 Duke of Wellington, Estate for Act 1819 c 21
 Duke of Wellington, Estate for Act 1819 c 63
 Duties in New South Wales Act 1819 c 114
 Duties on Glass (Great Britain) Act 1819 c 115
 Duties on Malt, etc. (Great Britain) Act 1819 c 88
 Duties on Malt, etc. (Ireland) Act 1819 c 87
 Duties on Mineral Alkali Act 1819 c 29
 Duties on Pensions Act 1819 c 3
 Duties on Soap, etc. (Great Britain) Act 1819 c 90
 Duties on Sweets, etc. Act 1819 c 89
 Duties on Tobacco, etc. Act 1819 c 32
 Exchequer Bills Act 1819 c 4
 Exchequer Bills Act 1819 c 20
 Exchequer Bills Act 1819 c 131
 Excise Act 1819 c 53
 Excise Act 1819 c 57
 Excise Act 1819 c 72
 Excise Act 1819 c 104
 Excise Act 1819 c 105
 Excise (Ireland) Act 1819 c 106
 Exoneration from a Crown Debt Act 1819 c 68
 Exportation Act 1819 c 112
 Exportation and Importation, Bermuda Act 1819 c 55
 Exportation from American Colonies Act 1819 c 14
 Exportation from the Bahamas Act 1819 c 18
 Felonies on Stage Coaches Act 1819 c 96
 Felony Act 1819 c 27
 Foreign Enlistment Act 1819 c 69
 Freight for Treasure Act 1819 c 25
 Friendly Societies Act 1819 c 128
 Gamekeepers, Wales Act 1819 c 102
 Highland Roads (Scotland) Act 1819 c 135
 House of Commons Act 1819 c 37
 Importation and Exportation Act 1819 c 125
 Importation, etc. Act 1819 c 73
 Importation, etc. Act 1819 c 74
 Indemnity Act 1819 c 11
 Insolvent Debtors (England) Act 1819 c 129
 Insolvent Debtors (Ireland) Act 1819 c 130
 Irish Fisheries Act 1819 c 109
 Jury Trials (Scotland) Act 1819 c 35
 King's Household During his Illness Act 1819 c 22
 Kinsale Act 1819 c 84. Sometimes called the Kinsale, Roads and Public Works, (Ireland) Act 1819.
 Land Tax Act 1819 c 138
 Laying of Accounts Before Parliament Act 1819 c 103
 Levant Company's Dues Act 1819 c 110
 Lotteries Act 1819 c 65
 Marine Mutiny Act 1819 c 10
 Militia Pay (Great Britain) Act 1819 c 116
 Militia Pay (Ireland) Act 1819 c 117
 Millbank Penitentiary Act 1819 c 136
 Mutiny Act 1819 c 9
 National Debt Act 1819 c 42
 National Debt Act 1819 c 71
 Navy Prize Orders Act 1819 c 56
 North American Fisheries Act 1819 c 38
 Ordinations for Colonies Act 1819 c 60. Sometimes called the Ordination for Colonies Act 1819.
 Passenger Vessels Act 1819 c 124
 Pauper Lunatics (England) Act 1819 c 127
 Payments into Receipt of the Exchequer Act 1819 c 39
 Permits, etc. (Ireland) Act 1819 c 107
 Poor Relief Act 1819 c 12
 Poor Relief (No. 2) Act 1819 c 95
 Post Office (Ireland) Act 1819 c 108
 Postage Act 1819 c 111
 Prisons (Ireland) Act 1819 c 100
 Produce of Consolidated Fund Act 1819 c 19
 Quartering of Soldiers Act 1819 c 26
 Registry, etc., of Colonial Slaves Act 1819 c 120
 Restriction on Cash Payments Act 1819 c 23
 Restriction on Cash Payments Act 1819 c 24
 Resumption of Cash Payments Act 1819 c 99
 Resumption of Cash Payments, etc. Act 1819 c 49
 Roads Between London and Holyhead Act 1819 c 48
 Sale of Certain Lands in Worcester Act 1819 c 137
 Savings Bank (Scotland) Act 1819 c 62
 Settlement of the Poor (England) Act 1819 c 50
 Shrewsbury to Holyhead Roads Act 1819 c 30
 Site for Docks, etc., Dublin Act 1819 c 82
 Slave Trade Act 1819 c 97
 Slave Trade Suppression, Portugal Act 1819 c 17
 Slave Trade Suppression, Netherlands Act 1819 c 16
 Smuggling Act 1819 c 121
 Southern Whale Fishery Act 1819 c 113
 Tonnage of Steam Vessels Act 1819 c 5
 Trade in Spirits Act 1819 c 75
 Trade with New South Wales Act 1819 c 122
 Transportation Act 1819 c 101
 Treasury Bills (Ireland) Act 1819 c 132
 Treaty with United States, etc. Act 1819 c 54
 Trials of Murders, etc., in Honduras Act 1819 c 44
 Vestries Act 1819 c 85
 Wages of Certain Deceased Seamen Act 1819 c 59
 Wages of Merchant Seamen Act 1819 c 58
 Warden of the Fleet Prison Act 1819 c 64
 Waterloo Subscription Fund Act 1819 c 34
 Westminster Parliamentary Elections Act 1819 c 2

60 Geo. 3 & 1 Geo. 4
 Criminal Libel Act 1819 c 8
 Duties on Malt, etc. Act 1819 c 3
 Labour in Cotton Mills, etc. Act 1819 c 5
 Newspapers, etc. Act 1819 c 9
 Parliamentary Elections Act 1819 c 7
 Pleading in Misdemeanor Act 1819 or the Pleading in Misdemeanour Act 1819 c 4
 Seditious Meetings, etc. Act 1819 c 6
 Seizure of Arms Act 1819 c 2
 Unlawful Drilling Act 1819 c 1

See also
List of Acts of the Parliament of the United Kingdom

External links
- Volume 43, Part 1 - 41 George III (UK) - 1801
- Volume 44, Part 1 - 43 George III - 1802-3
- Volume 45, Part 1 - 44 George III - 1803-4
- Volume 46 - 46 George III - 1806
 - 47 George III Sess. 1 - 1806-7 - 47 George III Sess. 2 - 1807
- 48 George III - 1808
- Volume 48 - 49 George III - 1809
- Volume 49 - 50 George III - 1810
- Volume 50 - 51 George III - 1811 - also
- 52 George III - 1812
- 53 George III - 1812-3
- Volume 53 pt 1 - 54 George III - 1814 - Volume 53 pt 2 - 54 George III - 1814
- 55 George III - 1814-5
- 56 George III - 1816
- 57 George III - 1817
- Volume 57 - 58 George III - 1818 - also
- 59 George III - 1819
- 60 George III & 1 George IV - 1820 - 1 George IV - 1820

References

1801
1800s in the United Kingdom
1810s in the United Kingdom